= New World Alliance =

American political organization

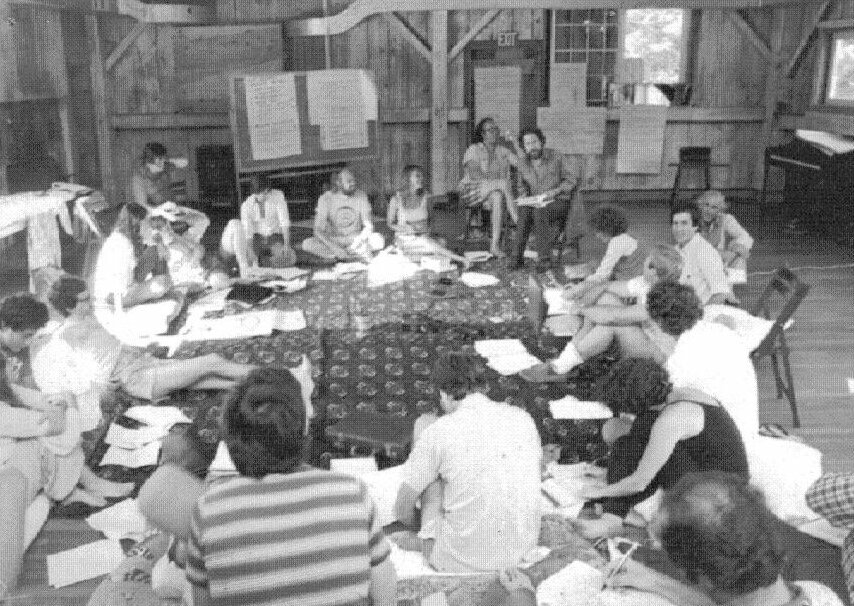
Governing Council of the New World Alliance meets at a lodge in upstate New York, September 1980. Leonard Duhl of UC Berkeley is seated at the upper left, Michael Marien of the World Future Society is seated with legs crossed at the upper right, and spiritual-politics theorist and activist Corinne McLaughlin is sitting to Marien's right.

The New World Alliance was an American political organization that sought to articulate and implement what it called "transformational" political ideas. It was organized in the late 1970s and dissolved in 1983. It has been described as the first U.S. national political organization of its type and as the first entity to articulate transformational ideas in a comprehensive political program.

The Alliance maintained a national office two blocks from the White House. It established chapters across the U.S., produced a 98-page political platform, conducted "Political Awareness Seminars" to help participants learn to communicate across ideological and psychological divides, initiated national "Consultations with Elected Officials," and produced a national political newsletter whose sponsors included Ecotopia author Ernest Callenbach and psychologist Carl Rogers.

Over the decades, social scientists and others have sought to explain why the Alliance did not achieve a longer life. There is no agreement. Explanations have touched on history (the U.S. was not ready), culture (the Alliance was too counter-cultural), process (the commitment to near-unanimous consensus decision-making was too onerous), leadership (the people on the Governing Council did not have the personalities or skills to build a mass organization), transformational political assumptions and behaviors (said to be inappropriate, self-defeating, or cult-like), and more. (Note: Many of these concerns were similar to those encountered by other organizations of the 1970s and 1980s that were seeking to develop alternatives to conventional political perspectives and processes. See, for example, Susan Brownmiller on the second-wave feminist movement, Andrew Cornell on Movement for a New Society, and John Rensenbrink on the early U.S. Green Party movement.)

Following the dissolution of the organization, many former Governing Council members and other founders of the Alliance – many near the beginning of their careers – took transformational ideas into a variety of organizational settings, including the early U.S. Green Party movement and the multinational corporate world. Their organizational efforts and published political writings extended into the 21st century.

== A "transformational" politics ==
"The 10 Goals of the New World Alliance: 1. A politics of hope; 2. A politics of healing; 3. A politics of rediscovery; 4. A politics of human growth; 5. A politics of ecology; 6. A politics of participation; 7. A politics of appropriate scale; 8. A politics of globalism; 9. A politics of technological creativity; 10. A politics of spirituality."

— New World Alliance, "Introductory Brochure," 1980.

After the political turmoil of the 1960s, many writers and activists began searching for a new political perspective that would give special weight to such topics as consciousness change, ecology, decentralization of power, and global cooperation. Some called the emerging new perspective "transformational."

=== Naming the Alliance's politics ===
The New World Alliance has been described by many terms other than transformational – among them, new paradigm, Aquarian Conspiracy, (Note: The reference is to Marilyn Ferguson's book The Aquarian Conspiracy: Personal and Social Transformation in the 1980s. Of the seven "Related books of interest" listed in Ferguson's chapter on politics, two were by members of the Alliance's Governing Council, and a third was by a founding sponsor of the Alliance's newsletter.) New Age-oriented, (Note: Self Determination was characterized as an exemplary transformational political organization in Marilyn Ferguson's book The Aquarian Conspiracy. According to Ferguson, it was founded in 1976 by California state assemblyman John Vasconcellos and other politicians and citizens to encourage Californians to take responsibility for their lives.) postliberal, post-socialist, and Green. A libertarian magazine found the Alliance's newsletter to be "surprisingly libertarian," and a book about radical centrism characterized the Alliance as radical centrist.

However, "transformational" has been the term most frequently used to describe the Alliance's politics, both by political scientists and by the Alliance itself. For example, an article from the Alliance's chairperson was entitled "The New World Alliance: Toward a Transformational Politics," and the Alliance's political platform is entitled "A Transformation Platform: The Dialogue Begins."

=== Describing the Alliance's politics ===
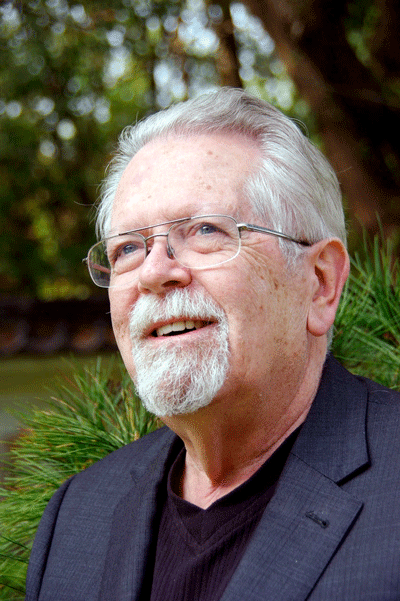
Academic J. Gordon Melton said the Alliance attempted to combine left- and right-wing perspectives.

Many attempts have been made to describe the Alliance's approach to transformational politics. Cultural critic Annie Gottlieb interviewed an Alliance member who said its goal was "to embody a new holistic vision of politics in America." Futurists Jessica Lipnack and Jeffrey Stamps said the Alliance was attempting to introduce values into politics that had traditionally been outside it. British Green activist Sara Parkin named some of those values, including "healing," "rediscovery," and "spirituality." Scholar J. Gordon Melton and his colleagues focused on the Alliance's commitment to combining supposed opposites – left and right, personal and political. Citing the ancient Greek concept of Paideia, Alliance chair Bob Olson told an interviewer that the Alliance wanted to build a society where every institution was geared to developing people's abilities and potentials.

Political theorists Corinne McLaughlin and Gordon Davidson identified what they felt was a defining passage in one Alliance document:

Politics is the way we live our lives. It is not just running for office. It is the way we treat each other, as individuals, as groups, as government. It is the way we treat our environment. It is the way we treat ourselves.

Arthur Stein, a political scientist at University of Rhode Island, pointed to another passage in an Alliance document:

The NWA seeks to break away from the old quarrels of "left against right" and help create a new consensus based on our heartfelt needs. It emphasizes personal growth – and nurturing others – rather than indiscriminate material growth. It advocates "human scale" institutions that function with human consideration and social responsibilities. It draws on the social movements of the recent past for new values like ecological responsibility, self-realization and planetary cooperation and sharing. It draws on our conservative heritage for values such as personal responsibility, self-reliance, thrift, neighborliness and community. It draws from the liberal traditions a commitment to human and civil rights, economic equity and social justice. We call this synthesis "New World" politics.

Author Kirkpatrick Sale observed that the Alliance's newsletter boiled its definition of transformational politics down to a phrase – "the reconceptualization of politics along human growth, decentralist, and world order lines." "As sorry a mouthful of rhetoric as that is," Sale concluded, "that's roughly what this 'transformational' idea is all about." (Note: In an anthology from 1998, in an attempt to delineate the transformational politics concept, Auburn University political scientist Christa Slaton listed nine authors: Fritjof Capra (for The Tao of Physics and The Turning Point), Marilyn Ferguson (for The Aquarian Conspiracy), Betty Friedan (The Feminine Mystique), Hazel Henderson (The Politics of the Solar Age), John Naisbitt (Megatrends), Mark Satin (New Age Politics), E. F. Schumacher (Small Is Beautiful), and Alvin and Heidi Toffler (Future Shock and The Third Wave).)

== History ==
=== The organizing tour ===
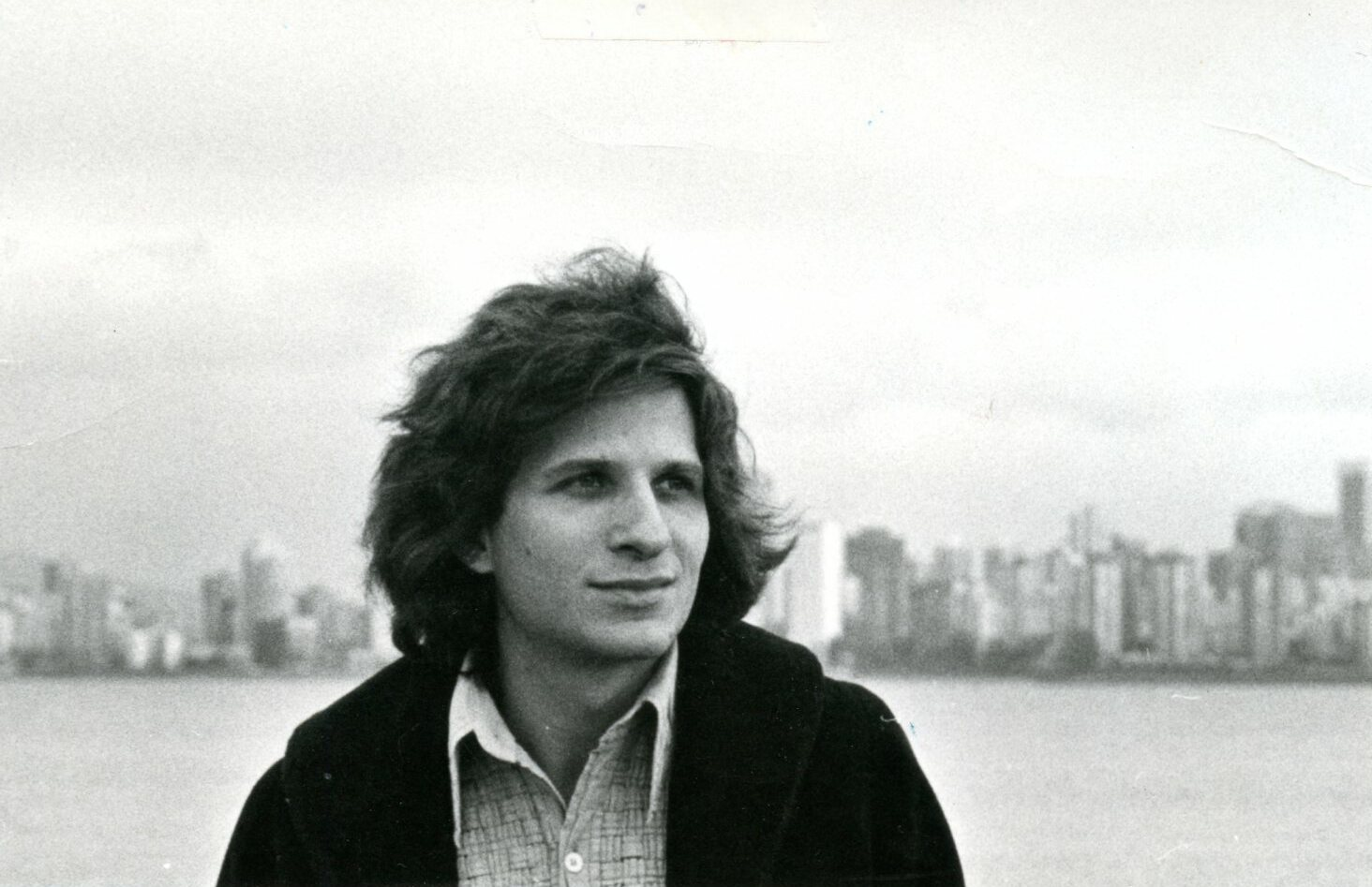
Mark Satin at the start on his 24-city organizing tour for the Alliance, Vancouver, Canada, 1978. (Photo by Erich Hoyt.)

Organizing for the Alliance began in 1978, when author Mark Satin embarked on a two-year tour of North America. Although the tour was initially designed to promote one of his books at conferences and other events, it quickly expanded into an effort to locate those who wanted to start a new political organization with a new political perspective. Satin told the authors of the book Networking that he traveled "systematically" to 24 cities and regions across the continent. He was especially interested in finding people committed enough to want to fill out an extensive questionnaire about the future organization. According to one magazine, by the summer of 1979 Satin had traveled over 50,000 miles, mostly by Greyhound bus. He stopped when he found 500 people that were willing to answer the questionnaire.

=== The questionnaire ===
The questionnaire, when finally composed and sent out, came to 21 pages. One political science text later compared it to a Delphi survey. It consisted largely of multiple-choice questions about what a transformation-oriented political organization should consist of. Some questions dealt with policy; for example, "How can we make small family farming more of an option for Americans?" Others dealt with structure – "How large should the Board of Directors be?"

Of the 500 people the questionnaire was sent to, 350 responded. The author of the book Green Parties described the respondents as people involved in personal-growth work and social change. The editors of a book on transformational politics described them as "academics, policy experts, and political activists interested in this emerging political perspective."

While it is not clear how closely the organization followed the questionnaire in shaping itself, one political scientist thought it significant that the "overwhelming source" of U.S. political problems among questionnaire-answerers was found to be "our attitudes and values."

=== "Governing Council" ===
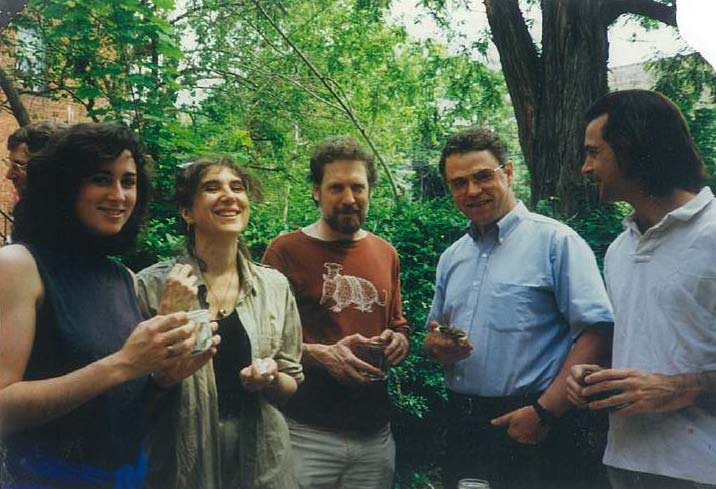
GC chairperson Bob Olson (second from right) was a project director at the U.S. Office of Technology Assessment. GC member Kirkpatrick Sale (center) was a Neo-Luddite theorist.

The questionnaire determined that a 39-member board of directors, called the Governing Council (GC), should be chosen to run the Alliance. In addition, it determined that the GC should be chosen from among the questionnaire-answerers themselves. Eighty-nine of them volunteered to stand for the GC, and the first 39 GCers were chosen by a variety of means: 40% by mail ballot, 30% by lottery, 20% by Satin (who'd met the questionnaire-answerers during his bus tour), and 10% by four women.

The selection process produced a diverse GC. A political scientist pointed to "teachers, feminists, think-tank members." A journalist called attention to a Ronald Reagan speechwriter, a former Robert F. Kennedy speechwriter, a corporate vice-president, and a spiritual teacher. A spokesperson for the Alliance touted "a co-author of the Pentagon Papers" as well as "several people from the erstwhile counterculture."

In 1980, the 39 GC members included Jim Benson, Clement Bezold, Lex Hixon, Miller Hudson, John McClaughry, Corinne McLaughlin, Kirkpatrick Sale, Mark Satin, Eric Utne, Robert Buxbaum of the Office of the New York City Council President, Jeff Cox of the Rodale Institute, Leonard Duhl of UC Berkeley, Bethe Hagens of Governors State University, Donald Keys of the World Federalists, James Ogilvy of SRI International, Bob Olson of the Office of Technology Assessment of the U.S. Congress, James Turner of The Chemical Feast, Gail Whitty of the NOW-Detroit board of directors, Malon Wilkus of the Federation of Egalitarian Communities, and Rarihokwats, founder of Akwesasne Notes newspaper from the Mohawk Nation at Akwesasne. (Note: This list of Governing Council members and their organizational affiliations is drawn entirely from the "Governing Council" page of the Alliance's political platform. No other source was used. It is a selective list, consisting of all GC members that have biographies on Wikipedia, and most GCers whose then-current affiliations – clearly stated on the "Governing Council" page – were to organizations with articles now on Wikipedia. To be the subject of a Wikipedia article, individuals and organizations must meet certain criteria; see WP:Notability.) Besides being on the GC, Olson served as chairperson of the Alliance.

=== Structure and process ===
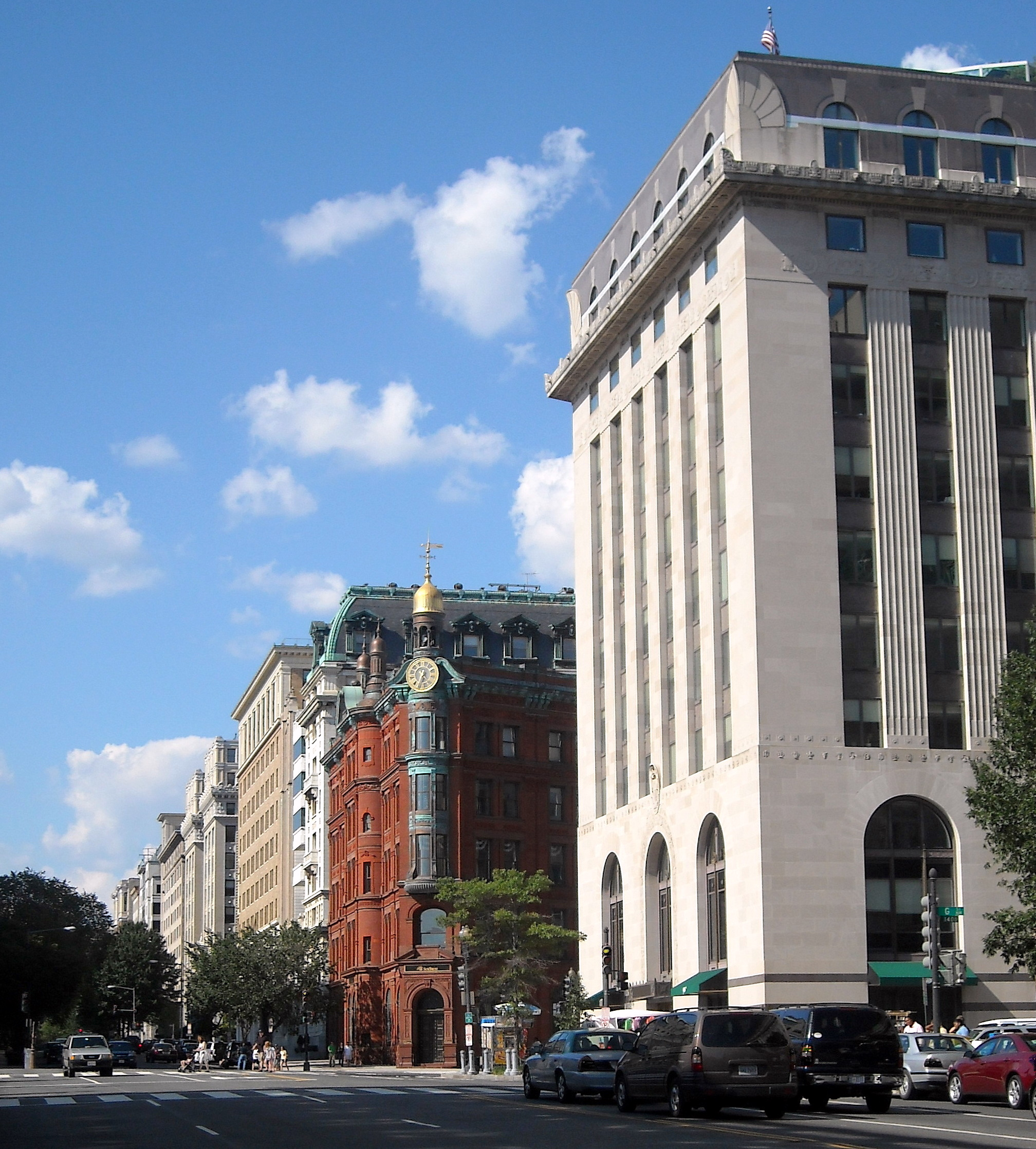
The Alliance's national office was two blocks from the White House, in the light brown building midway down the row of buildings here. (Note: According to journalist Ted Cox, the address was 733 Fifteenth Street N.W., Washington, D.C. The address is given in Wikimedia's description of this photograph; to read it, click on the photo and then scroll down. The description identifies 733 as the sixth building from the right, and viewers should note that three narrow buildings to its immediate left are difficult to distinguish from one another. The entire stretch of buildings constitutes part of what is now known as the Financial Historic District.)

The Governing Council met semi-annually. There was also a Coordinating Committee, and a national office was established two blocks from the White House in Washington, D.C.

But one of the Alliance's expressed goals was "a politics of participation," and the GC chose not to run the Alliance from the top down. The authors of the book Networking describe the organization as "nonhierarchically structured" and say decisions were made by decentralized committees.

There were also local chapters. Belden Paulson, a political scientist at University of Wisconsin-Milwaukee, says that in the early years the Alliance had "a kind of missionary zeal" to establish local chapters across the U.S. He reports that 50 people turned up at the initial chapter meeting in Milwaukee and that the group met for several years.

The Alliance's processes emphasized consensus and even meditation. An encyclopedia from Gale Research reports that the Alliance expressed a "commitment to consensus building in all our groups and projects." It also reports that Alliance chapters and projects claimed to use "short periods of silence [in order] to draw on our intuition in making decisions and solving conflicts."

=== Projects ===
The Alliance sustained four principal projects.

==== Political platform ====
"The Transformation Platform of the New World Alliance is different from conventional political platforms in fundamental ways. ... It is an attempt to go beyond the polarity of left-against-right by integrating the highest values in our nation's conservative and liberal heritage with the learning that has taken place in recent social movements. ... It begins – but only just begins – a reconceptualization or paradigm change regarding the very nature of politics. We recognize that public policy is only one "face" of politics. Equally important political work takes place in the community, the workplace, and in personal development and interpersonal relationships."

— New World Alliance, introduction to A Transformation Platform: The Dialogue Begins, 1981.

The Alliance produced a 98-page political platform that achieved what one commentator claimed was wide circulation. A Transformation Platform: The Dialogue Begins discussed crime and justice, economics, science and technology, health, the environment, global affairs, and more. It made about 300 specific policy proposals. But it sought to do more than provide good ideas. Bob Olson, chair of the Alliance, tried to explain to the Association for Humanistic Psychology why he felt the platform was unique:

... we call [it] a Living Platform. The platform offers concrete political proposals, but doesn't purport to offer final answers. It includes commentary and dissenting opinion, and it asks readers to criticize it and help improve it, so that over the years ahead it can serve as a focus for thousands of people to cooperate in thinking through the changes we need to make.

==== "Political Awareness Seminars" ====
These were day-long or weekend experiences designed to make participants more deeply aware of the political process and their own potential for using it to heal society. To some observers, the seminars functioned primarily to build self-confidence. To Olson, they helped participants discover and merge their visions of a better society, and explore how to implement them. To the authors of Spiritual Politics, the key part came when participants were asked to act out their feelings toward their political adversaries – and were then told to reverse roles. "Many deep insights resulted," the authors wrote, "with participants discovering [they] often had problems similar to the ones they accused their adversaries of having."

==== "Consultations with Elected Officials" ====
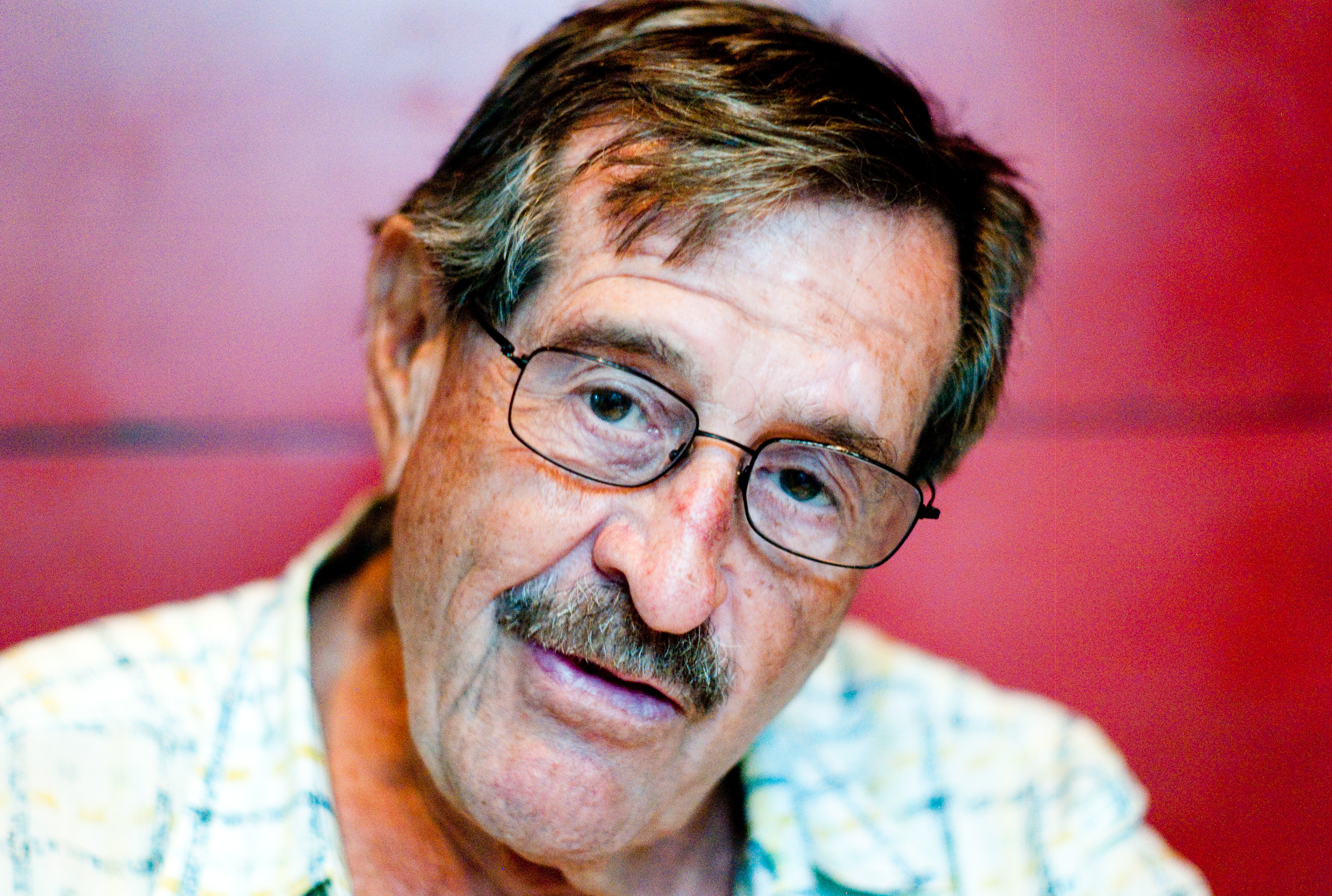
California legislator John Vasconcellos invited people to the Alliance's first "Consultation with Elected Officials" and was a featured speaker there.

These were national conferences of "transformation-oriented" politicians, Alliance GC members, and other interested parties. Political science professor Belden Paulson, who helped coordinate the first one, in Milwaukee, says he recruited California state legislator John Vasconcellos and Colorado state legislator Miller Hudson to invite people to the weekend event and be speakers there. Sixteen elected officials ended up attending. There were also eight Alliance GC members, six academics, spiritual writer David Spangler, and some residents of intentional communities. According to a letter Paulson quotes from one of the intentional-community residents, there was great tension at the consultation between pragmatists and visionaries – until the last day, when "it all came together, starting with the politicians who, one by one, spoke of how this opened whole new horizons for them."

==== National political newsletter ====
Renewal newsletter attempted to report on current affairs from a transformational perspective. It also attempted to critically assess relevant groups and books and serve as a forum for activists. It boasted nine founding sponsors – Ernest Callenbach, Willis Harman, Hazel Henderson, Karl Hess, Patricia Mische (co-author of Toward a Human World Order), Jeremy Rifkin, James Robertson, Carl Rogers, and John Vasconcellos. The newsletter's annual "Transformational Book Award" was voted upon by 70 hand-picked academics and think tank staffers from across the U.S.

=== Restructuring and dissolution ===
The Alliance restructured itself in 1982. It decided to close its Washington, D.C. office but keep the Governing Council intact. Rather than running and funding projects and supporting an organizational infrastructure, it would seek to serve as a kind of umbrella for entrepreneurial, independently run projects. It dissolved the next year.

== Assessments ==
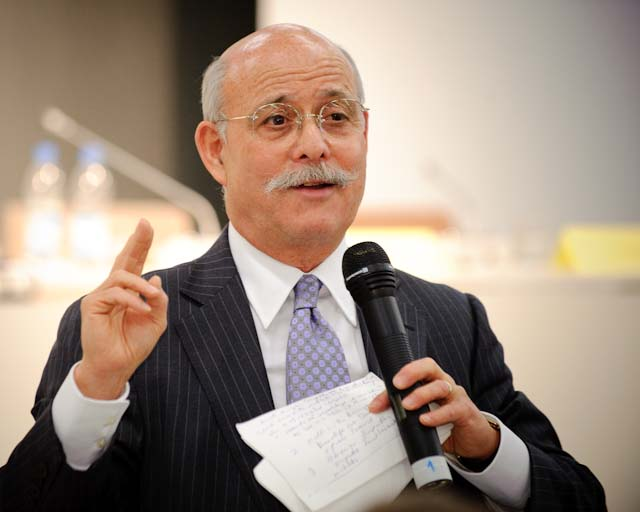
Prominent writer and activist Jeremy Rifkin was a founding sponsor of the Alliance's political newsletter.

The Alliance raised many hopes in transformational circles. For example, New Realities, a glossy transformation-oriented magazine, devoted a 3,000-word article to the organizing effort, and futurist Hazel Henderson pointed her readers beyond the U.S. Citizens Party to the "more visionary" movement incorporating as the New World Alliance. Arthur Stein noted that each of the founding sponsors of the Alliance's political newsletter had distinguished themselves in their fields.

To some observers, including some inside the organization, the Alliance fell short of its promise and potential. It was certainly "short-lived," as three political scientists put it. To other observers, the Alliance was a valuable pioneer.

=== External critics ===
Some critics focused on history and culture. To political scientist Belden Paulson, the Alliance fell short partly because it was too far ahead of its cultural moment. To Annie Gottlieb, author of a book about the mainstreaming of Sixties-generation attitudes and values, the Alliance fell short because it did not sufficiently root itself in the mainstream culture, and in the immediately practical and viable.

Other explanations focused on the Alliance's processes. Scholar J. Gordon Melton's encyclopedia said the focus on consensus led to "extended meetings and minimal results" – which in turn led to dispirited participants. Even Aquarian Conspiracy author Marilyn Ferguson commented that the GC meetings, full of "intoxicating rhetoric" but little else, took their toll on one GC member.

Still other explanations focused on internal dysfunction. Belden Paulson noted ongoing "friction and personality struggles." He also found it incomprehensible that the Alliance always seemed to be without money. He finally concluded that the GCers with the most power were more interested in advancing their own organizations.

Some critics were skeptical about, or hostile to, the Alliance's transformational ideology. Speaking on a panel with two Alliance GC members at an Association for Humanistic Psychology conference in 1982, political scientist Walter Truett Anderson rejected the concept of transformation. He argued that it had become a cliché and that society was not going to transform itself totally or quickly. He added that its advocates were on the verge of becoming "what I think can rightfully be called a cult."

The Alliance generated opposition among conservative Christians who worried that New Age ideas were being spread under the banner of transformational politics. For example, in her book The Hidden Dangers of the Rainbow, attorney Constance Cumbey warned that New Age ideas were being "synergistically enhanced by the parallel operation of networking organizations such as New World Alliance." In an anthology called The New Age Rage, religious philosopher Douglas Groothuis said transformational initiatives like the Alliance were slipping New Age ideas into U.S. Democratic Party politics.

=== Internal critics ===
"Belief that a social transformation is happening serves to keep it from happening. Behaviors associated with the sandbox of political impotency include: pronouncement of actual or imminent success, confusion of goals and results, an acritical stance, hubris, an incapacitating dialect, pseudo holism, egalitarian blinders, and self-centeredness. Upward growth to escape the Sandbox Syndrome is a necessary ingredient of any serious social change."

— Alliance GC member Michael Marien, "The Transformation as Sandbox Syndrome," 1983.

Both before and after the Alliance dissolved, GC members publicly criticized the Alliance. In 1987, former GC member Marc Sarkady told an interviewer that the Alliance was too immersed in the counter-culture. In 1983, writing in a feminist quarterly, GCer Bethe Hagens said that – despite all the high-minded rhetoric and processes – the male GCers had been dismissive of the female GCers. In 1982, Mark Satin complained to an audience of 400 that the Alliance could not decide on its mission. (Note: GC members had disparate visions for the organization. Some GCers wanted the Alliance to be or become a political party, Satin wanted the Alliance to model itself on grassroots mobilization and lobbying groups such as Moral Majority, and others – ultimately a majority – wanted the Alliance to play a less assertive, clearinghouse role.) Later that decade Satin referred to his former colleagues as "beautiful losers," and even in the 2000s he was writing about what he saw as the Alliance's "ineptness" and its failure to understand and seize the moment.

A more systemic critique by a GC member was Michael Marien's essay "The Transformation as Sandbox Syndrome," published in the Journal of Humanistic Psychology in 1983. While Marien aimed his critique at transformational political organizations (and activists) in general, the introduction discusses Marien's involvement in just one such organization – the Alliance. His targets in the essay include mistaking lofty goals for political significance, loving-kindness for effective action, and good intentions for actual results.

Toward the end of its existence, Alliance chair Bob Olson wrote – in a spirit of acceptance rather than blame – that the GC did not have the "personalities and skills" to create the kind of dynamic mass-membership organization that had originally been envisioned.

=== Positive views ===
Many observers have acknowledged the Alliance for what they see as pioneering contributions to the social change movement.

For example, the director of Self Determination, a California-wide transformational political organization co-founded by John Vasconcellos, described the Alliance as "the first" national political organization of its kind. Political scientist Arthur Stein claimed it made "the first attempt to take ecological, decentralist, globalist, and human-growth ideas and translate them into a detailed, practical political platform."

A pair of futurists credited the Alliance with attempting to create a national political movement based on new values. A pair of political theorists said the Alliance was one of the first groups attempting to create "a new synthesis" of left-wing and right-wing political ideas. In a textbook, three political scientists identified the Alliance as a "precursor" of North American Greens.

== Aftermath ==
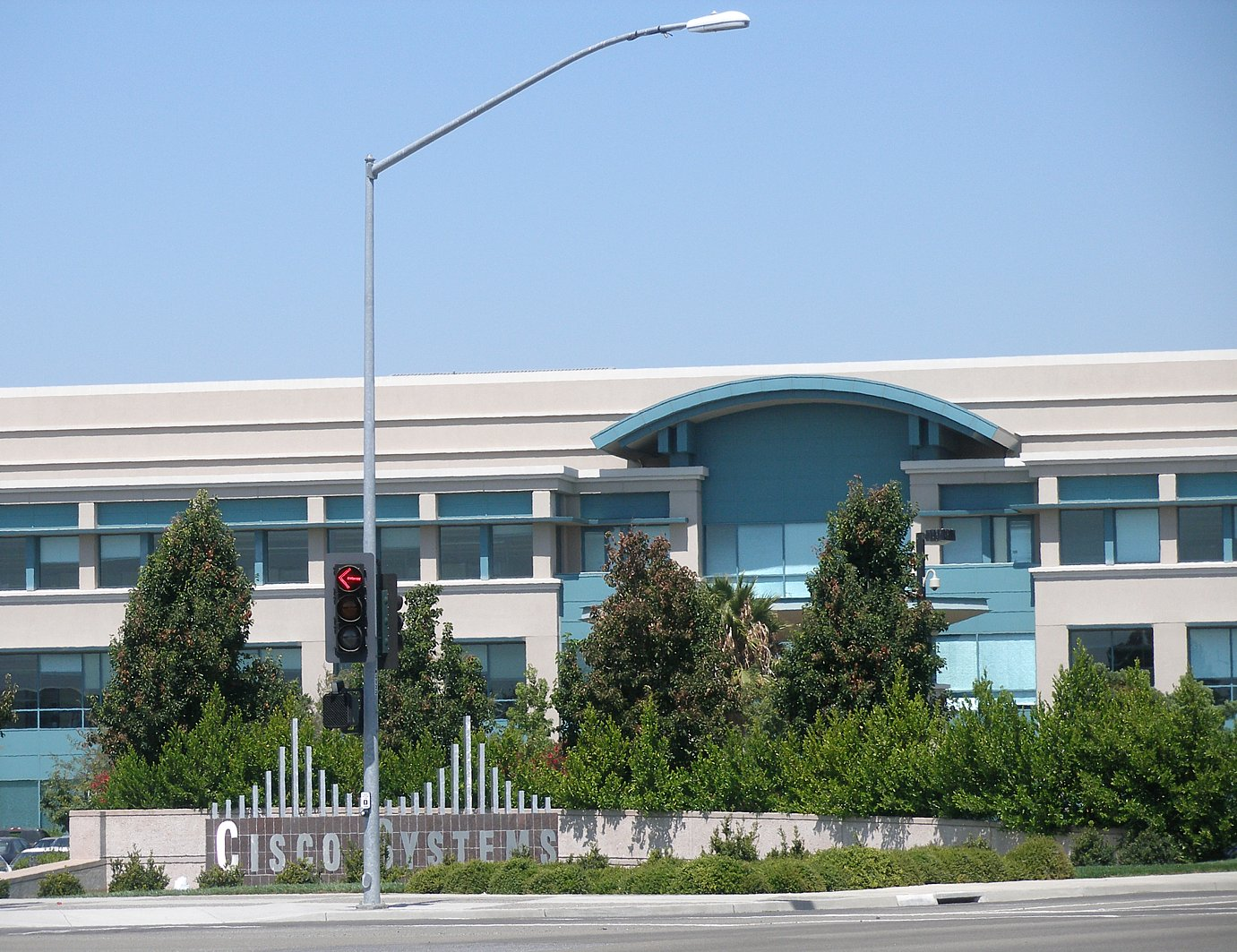
Alliance co-founder Gordon Feller later became "urban innovations" director at Cisco Systems in Silicon Valley.

Many initial Governing Council members and other founders of the Alliance – often at the early stages of their careers – engaged in transformation-oriented activities after the Alliance dissolved in 1983. (Note: The names of 39 early GC members and five additional founding members are on the "Governing Council" page of the Alliance's political platform. These are the only founders named in this section, except for Joseph Simonetta, who is identified as a founder in a reference below.) Some of them contributed to transformational theory and practice for many decades.

In 1984, at least nine people associated with the Alliance were among the 62 people in attendance at the invitation-only founding meeting of the U.S. Green Party movement in St. Paul, Minnesota. In addition, the Alliance's platform circulated there. One former GCer, Mark Satin, was later credited with helping to initiate that meeting, and in a scholarly book on the early U.S. Greens, ecofeminist author Greta Gaard concluded that Satin "played a significant role in facilitating the articulation of Green political thought," and that his political philosophy influenced the Greens' "ideological foundation."

Other former Alliance members helped organize other transformation-oriented political initiatives. For example, GC members Corinne McLaughlin and Stephen Woolpert helped develop the Ecological and Transformational Politics Section (section #26) of the American Political Science Association, Leonard Duhl helped initiate the Healthy Cities program at the World Health Organization, and Alanna Hartzok co-founded the Earth Rights Institute.

Some Alliance founders later ran for seats in the U.S. Congress, though none won. In 1986, Joseph Simonetta – co-founder of an Alliance chapter – obtained the Democratic Party nomination for a House seat. (Note: Simonetta ran on the slogan "The Heroes Are Us"; his campaign literature spoke of the dangers of "excessive consumption" and "immediate gratification." His campaign logo consisted of a world map crossed by two lines – "symbolic of the fact," he said, "that we live in an interrelated, interdependent world.") Six years later, former GC member John McClaughry obtained the Republican Party nomination for a Senate seat. In 2001, former GCer Alanna Hartzok obtained the Green Party nomination for a House seat, and in 2014 she obtained the Democratic Party nomination for that same seat.

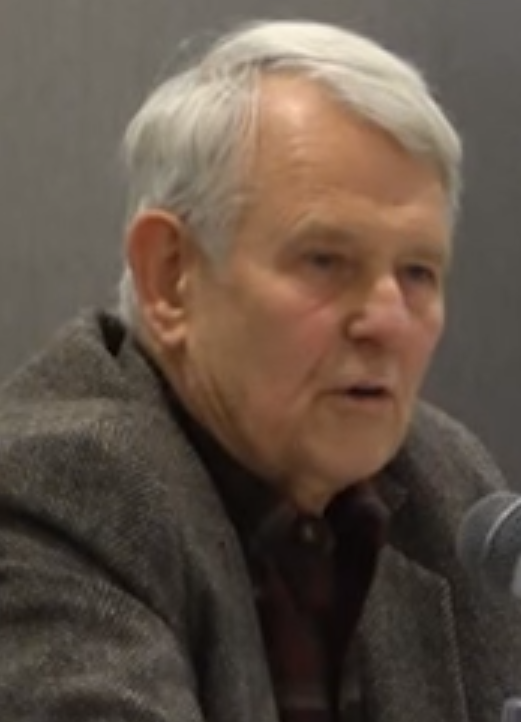
Alliance co-founder John McClaughry later co-authored a book about small-scale democracy. (Photo by ORCA Media.)

Several Alliance founders later took transformational ideas into the multinational corporate world. James Ogilvy co-founded the Global Business Network to introduce futures thinking and scenario planning to multinational corporations. Marc Sarkady became a global management consultant explicitly committed to "organizational transformation" and "visionary leadership"; one of his earliest challenges was trying to build teamwork among General Motors executives. Malon Wilkus, an intentional community activist while on the GC, eventually became head of American Capital Strategies and won praise in a book devoted to "creative inside reformers." Richard B. Perl founded an international investment company helping Japanese investors do environmentally friendly real estate development in the U.S. He also partnered with a French chocolate manufacturer. (Note: Perl also became one of five key leaders of the Social Venture Network, an organization incubating socially responsible businesses.) Jim Benson founded innovative computer and space firms, including SpaceDev. Gordon Feller became director of "urban innovations" at Cisco Systems, a multinational technology company.

One year after the Alliance dissolved, two former GC members launched transformation-oriented periodicals, Eric Utne with Utne Reader and Mark Satin with New Options Newsletter. One futurist described New Options as a "successor" to the Alliance's newsletter. While these periodicals did not please some critics, such as conservative scholar George Weigel, others found them rewarding. (Note: Cultural critic Annie Gottlieb stated in 1987 that Utne Reader and New Options were among "our generation's most characteristic creations right now, and the networks through which we talk to one another.")

Many Alliance founders wrote transformation-oriented political books after the Alliance dissolved. (Note: This recitation of books is intended to be suggestive rather than complete. For that reason, it is limited to one post-1983, transformation-oriented book per Alliance founder. Because GCers Davidson and McLaughlin are joint authors, two of their books are given.) These addressed a variety of traditional and emerging subjects, including intentional communities, work and health, bioregionalism, futures studies, the interconnectedness of global issues, small-scale participatory democracy, social entrepreneurship, sustainable cities, environmental technologies, radical centrism, land rights, transpartisanship, and spiritual politics. One former GCer became lead editor of an academic textbook on transformational politics.

Some former GCers' transformational books were more personal. Bob Dunsmore wrote about being an activist for 40 years, James Ogilvy wrote about moving from goal-driven to soul-driven, Eric Utne exhorted readers to "Look Up, Look Out, Look In," and Norie Huddle wrote a book explaining transformational ideas to children and others entitled simply Butterfly.

== See also ==
- Futures studies
- Green politics
- Humanistic psychology
- Transformative social change
- Transpartisan
