= CRMA =

CRMA may refer to:

- Critical Raw Materials Act
- City and Regional Magazine Association
- Chulachomklao Royal Military Academy
- Civil Rights Movement Archive
- Canadian Radio Music Awards
