= Rick Fields =

American journalist, poet and historian

- Born: Frederick Douglas Fields; May 16, 1942; New York City, U.S.
- Died: June 6, 1999 (aged 57)
- Education: Harvard University
- Occupations: Journalist; poet; historian

Rick Fields (May 16, 1942 – June 6, 1999) was an American journalist, poet, and historian specializing in the history of Buddhism in the United States.

== Biography ==
Born Frederick Douglas Fields in Queens, New York, he attended Andrew Jackson High School, where he was a track athlete, and later enrolled at Harvard University but was expelled in 1964.

After leaving Harvard, Fields moved to New York City and associated with poets Allen Ginsberg and Gary Snyder. He later relocated to California, engaging with Zen centers in San Francisco and Los Angeles. In the early 1970s, he developed an interest in Tibetan Buddhism and became a student of Chogyam Trungpa Rinpoche, focusing on the Kagyu and Nyingma traditions.

Fields began his journalism career with the Whole Earth Catalog in 1969. He was involved in founding Tricycle: The Buddhist Review magazine in 1991 and served as a contributing editor. He also worked as an editor for publications including Yoga Journal and New Age Journal, and was editor-in-chief of the Vajradhatu Sun, later renamed the Shambhala Sun. Additionally, he taught at the Naropa Institute's Jack Kerouac School in Boulder, Colorado.

== Writing ==
Fields authored several books, most notably How the Swans Came to the Lake: A Narrative History of Buddhism in America (1981), which traces the development of Buddhism in the United States from the 19th century onward. Other works include Chop Wood, Carry Water (1984), Code of the Warrior (1991), The Awakened Warrior (1994), The Turquoise Bee: The Love Poems of the Sixth Dalai Lama (1994, with Brian Cutillo), and Instructions to the Cook: A Zen Master's Lessons in Living a Life That Matters (1996, with Bernard Glassman).

In his later years, Fields wrote poetry addressing his experiences with cancer from a Buddhist perspective.
