= Roy MacSkimming =

- Occupation: Novelist

Roy MacSkimming is a Canadian novelist, non-fiction writer and cultural policy consultant.

He was educated at the University of Toronto, MacSkimming broke into book publishing in 1964 at Clarke, Irwin and later co-founded New Press, one of Canada's leading small presses of the 1970s. He has been books editor and literary columnist at The Toronto Star, and has contributed to a number of newspapers and periodicals, including The Globe and Mail, The Ottawa Citizen, Maclean's and Saturday Night. MacSkimming has served as publishing officer with the Canada Council for the Arts, and policy director of the Association of Canadian Publishers.

MacSkimming has written two novels with European settings: Formentera (1972), set in the Balearic Islands, and Out of Love (1993), set in Athens and Crete. He has also written Gordie: A Hockey Legend (1994), an unauthorized biography of Gordie Howe; and Cold War (1996), a reassessment of the 1972 Canada-Soviet hockey series.

MacSkimming draws on his professional lifetime in and around the publishing industry in The Perilous Trade: Publishing Canada's Writers (2003). The title was nominated for the National Business Book Award, and was a Globe and Mail Notable Book of the Year. It was reissued by McClelland & Stewart in an updated paperback edition in 2007.

MacSkimming's third novel, Macdonald, based on the final days of Canada's founding prime minister Sir John A. Macdonald, was published in 2007. His most recent novel is Laurier in Love (2010), based on the tangled love life of Canadian prime minister Sir Wilfrid Laurier.

MacSkimming lives near Perth, Ontario.

== Bibliography ==
=== Fiction ===
==== Poetry ====
- Shoot Low, Sheriff, They're Riding Shetland Ponies (with William Hawkins). Independent, 1964

==== Novels ====
- Formentera. Toronto: New Press, 1972
- Out of Love. Dunvegan, ON: Cormorant Books, 1993
- Macdonald. Toronto: Thomas Allen Publishers, 2007
- Laurier in Love. Toronto: Thomas Allen Publishers, 2010

=== Non-Fiction ===
- On Your Own Again Toronto: McClelland & Stewart, 1992. (with Keith Anderson)
- Gordie: An Unauthorized Biography of Gordie Howe. Vancouver: Greystone, 1994, 2003.
- Cold War: The Amazing Canada-Soviet Hockey Series of 1972. Vancouver: Greystone, 1996.
- The Perilous Trade: Publishing Canada’s Writers. Toronto: McClelland & Stewart 2003, 2007.

== Awards ==
- Finalist, National Magazine Awards, 1996
- Finalist, Ottawa-Carleton Book Award, 1996 - Cold War
- Janice E. Handford Small Press Award for contributions to Canadian book publishing, 1998
- Globe and Mail 100 Notable Books of the Year, 2003 - The Perilous Trade
- Finalist, National Business Book Award, 2003 - The Perilous Trade
