= The Chemical Feast =

1970 book by Jim Turner

The Chemical Feast: Ralph Nader's Study Group Report on the Food and Drug Administration
- Author: Jim Turney
- Language: English
- Publisher: Grossman Publishers
- Publication date: 1970
- ISBN: 4-411-03350-X

The Chemical Feast: Ralph Nader's Study Group Report on the Food and Drug Administration is a 1970 book usually associated with the name of Ralph Nader, who wrote its Introduction, but authored by public interest, regulatory affairs attorney Jim Turner which is critical of the policies and practices of its subject, the United States' Food and Drug Administration.
