= Walter Truett Anderson =

American political scientist

- Born: February 27, 1933 (age 93)
- Occupations: Political scientist, social psychologist, author

Walter Truett Anderson (born February 27, 1933) is an American political scientist, social psychologist, and author of numerous non-fiction books and articles in newspapers and magazines.

In his public lectures, he frequently speculates that, if we had a history of every advanced species in the universe, we would find that they all had to pass through two large, difficult and unavoidable transitions: (1) accepting conscious responsibility for the future of all life on their planets, and (2) recognizing that their systems of symbolic communication—such as language and mathematics—don’t merely describe reality, but participate in creating it.

Most of his major writing efforts have engaged one or both of these evolutionary themes. His defining statement on the first was To Govern Evolution: Further Adventures of the Political Animal. Its vision of human impacts on Earth’s life systems had been foreshadowed in his earlier book on American natural history, A Place of Power: The American Episode in Human Evolution, and was further developed in Evolution Isn’t What It Used To Be and All Connected Now. He is now at work on a new book that explores the evolutionary challenges and frontiers of the 21st century.

His major statements on the second (constructivist) theme were Reality Isn't What It Used to Be and the subsequent anthology The Truth About the Truth. In other books on related subjects, The Future of the Self described changing ways that people are constructing personal identities in contemporary global society, and The Next Enlightenment points out the similarities between Western constructivist thought and Eastern spiritual traditions such as Buddhism.

He is currently President Emeritus of the World Academy of Art and Science (having served as president 2000-2008); a founding Fellow of the Meridian International Institute; a Fellow of the Western Behavioral Sciences Institute (LaJolla, CA); and a Distinguished Consulting Faculty member of Saybrook University in San Francisco.

In his book Radical Middle, author Mark Satin characterizes Anderson as a radical centrist thinker.

== Biography ==
Anderson spent his early years on his family’s cattle ranch in northeastern Nevada, but has also lived and worked in Germany, Spain, England, and Southern California. His undergraduate education was in political science at the University of California, Berkeley. Later, after military service and several years in magazine journalism, he began graduate studies part-time, completing a doctorate in political science and social psychology at the University of Southern California.

For most of his adult life he has been an independent author, lecturer and consultant. He has also taught part-time at various institutions including the University of California, Berkeley; Saybrook University; the California School of Professional Psychology; and California State University, Northridge. In the 1980s and 90s he was also a contributing editor with Pacific News Service in San Francisco, where he wrote many newspaper op-ed columns as well as investigative feature stories. He is on the editorial boards of several journals including The Journal of Humanistic Psychology, Futures: The Journal of Policy, Planning, and Futures Studies, The Journal of Futures Studies (Tamkang University, Taiwan), and Cadmus: The Journal of the South East Asian Division of the World Academy of Art and Science (Zagreb).

== Books ==
- (2003) The Next Enlightenment: Integrating East and West in a New Vision of Human Evolution. St Martin’s Press.
- (2001, 2004) All Connected Now: Life in the First Global Civilization. Westview Press.
- (1997) The Future of the Self: Inventing the Postmodern Person. Tarcher/Putnam.
- (1996) Evolution Isn't What It Used to Be: The Augmented Animal and the Whole Wired World. W. H. Freeman and Company.
- (1995) Ed. The Truth About the Truth: De-confusing and Re-constructing the Postmodern World. Tarcher/Putnam. (1996) Published in the UK as The Fontana Post-Modernism Reader. Fontana Press.
- (1990, 1991) Reality Isn’t What It Used To Be: Theatrical Politics, Ready-to-Wear Religion, Global Myths, Primitive Chic, and Other Wonders of the Postmodern World. HarperCollins.
- (1987) To Govern Evolution: Further Adventures of the Political Animal. Harcourt Brace Jovanovich.
- (1983, 1984) The Upstart Spring: Esalen and the American Awakening. Addison-Wesley. (2004) Republished as The Upstart Spring: Esalen and the Human Potential Movement: The First Twenty Years. iUniverse.
- (1983) Ed. Rethinking Liberalism. Avon Books.
- (1979) Open Secrets: A Western Guide to Tibetan Buddhism. Viking. (1989) Republished as Open Secrets: A Guide to Tibetan Buddhism for Western Spiritual Seekers. Tarcher.
- (1977) Ed. Therapy and the Arts: Tools of Consciousness. Harper Colophon.
- (1976) A Place of Power: The American Episode in Human Evolution. Goodyear/Prentice-Hall.
