= Corinne McLaughlin =

American author and educator

Corinne McLaughlin (1947–2018) was an American author and educator. She was executive director of The Center for Visionary Leadership and a Fellow of The World Business Academy and the Findhorn Foundation in Scotland. McLaughlin and her partner Gordon Davidson founded Sirius, an ecological village in Massachusetts. She coordinated a national task force for President Clinton's Council on Sustainable Development and has taught politics at American University. McLaughlin has lectured in the U.S., Europe and South America. She is co-author of The Practical Visionary: A New World Guide to Spiritual Growth and Social Change, Spiritual Politics: Changing the World from the Inside Out and Builders of the Dawn: Community Lifestyles in a Changing World.

She died August 2018 following complications of Parkinsons.

== Books ==
- The Practical Visionary: A New World Guide to Spiritual Growth and Social Change, 2010. With Gordon Davidson, Unity House Publishers. ISBN 978-0-87159-340-5
- Spiritual Politics: Changing the World from the Inside Out. 1994. With Gordon Davidson. Ballantine/Random House Books. ISBN 0-345-36983-1
- Builders of the Dawn: Community Lifestyles in a Changing World. 1990. With Gordon Davidson. Book Publishing Company. ISBN 0-913990-68-X
