= Transformative social change =

Transformative social change is a philosophical, practical and strategic process to affect revolutionary change within society, i.e., social transformation. It is effectively a systems approach applied to broad-based social change and social justice efforts to catalyze sociocultural, socioeconomic and political revolution. In seeking to integrate and then politicize personal development and social development as an overarching approach to social change at multiple levels, addressing a wide range of issues, using holistic, nonviolent methods, it may be best classified as a new social movement. Rather than focus on particular issue(s), it seeks to impact the culture of left of center social movement and organizing work. However, by considering the dismantling of and liberation from oppressive systems, including economic, as core to its goal, it defies even definitions put forth for new social movements. As a comprehensive approach to progressive social change, it distinguishes itself from the "ordinary" change of conventional social change, social justice, and their respective organizing practices by placing emphasis on personal, organizational and social systemic change that cannot be undone, or "deep change".

== Definitions and components ==
A key premise defining transformative social change is that "the ends of justice can never be served by the means of injustice, even when the injustice is as subtle as the mental framework instilled by the quest for liberation." ("Change vs. Transformation" by Angel Kyodo Williams) Williams further proposes that "because suffering cannot be alleviated by instigating suffering"; the conditions under which social justice activists and seekers operate within organizationally must exemplify the conditions they wish to ultimately see cultivated within society at large (also known as prefiguration (politics)). This ideal coincides with the quote often attributed to, but not said by, Mahatma Gandhi: "You must be the change you wish to see in the world."

Seeking to better define and cohere the emerging and evolving work of transformative social change, a People's Movement Assembly process was held at the 2010 US Social Forum in Detroit, Michigan, in which the following framework for defining transformation was agreed to by way of resolution:

~Transformation, as applied to social change, is a process through which who we are – individually or collectively – is changed so deeply that the following are altered:

- identity (way of seeing/thinking/reflecting upon ourselves and environment),
- emotions (range of feelings and reactivity,)
- embodiment (relationship and connectedness to and within our bodies and how we show up,)
- actions (behaviors, patterned responses,)
- creativity (capacity for responsiveness and ability to access resources,) and
- paradigms (overall perspective and mode of operating.)

Further, the work of transformation requires the following components:

- Awareness of the default conditioning, habits and reactions in our individual, organizational and movement experience.
- Appreciation of old identities and states as they pass away and an understanding of the experience of crisis, breakdown, “undone-ness,” or “not-knowing” as a necessary catalyst that moves us toward new identities and states. People and entities can and must be supported in these periods.
- A container at the individual, organizational and movement levels; practices that support the process, and a commitment to mentoring people into the necessary skills and processes.
- A sustainable relationship with the whole web of life.

~ Transformation can and does consist of multi-disciplinary practices, modalities and paths, but overall it points toward the centrality of consistent, rigorous practice capable of undoing conditioning. Such a practice must effect systemic changes, internal and external. We refer to the broad spectrum of varied modalities as transformative practices.

~ Transformation happens in its own time and it can't be undone. We expect processes of transformation, as distinct from change, to be inclined towards being irreversible.

~ In the transformation process, one identity or self passes away and a new, radically altered one emerges. The new way of being is more integrated, resourceful and aligned. This is apparent to others in your presence, your actions and your increased capacity to respond based on vision, rather than reaction. This process repeats itself and deepens through continued engagement in transformative practices and processes. The old, previous “form” sheds again and new emerges again.

~ The methods and philosophy of transformation must be rooted in an explicit analysis of oppression.
~ We recognize that this work is grounded in ancient wisdom, lineages and history, and that it is entering a new phase of coherence that allows us to move forward.

== Outcomes sought ==
Applied transformation leads to the following outcomes:

- Radically increases awareness, clarity and comfort with direct experience what is so.
- Instigates breakthroughs in ways of knowing, thinking and accessing creativity.
- Impacts personal character of individuals in a way that is observable, felt and experienced by others.
- Increases ability to respond from a place of vision and compassion, rather than personal ego and self-interest.
- Increases capacity for skillfulness with and practice of: presence, authenticity and interdependence.

== Grants and awards ==
In 2009, the Seasons Fund for Social Transformation, a funding collaborative of representatives from small to large foundations, including W. W. Kellogg Foundation, Ford Foundation, Hidden Leaf Fund, Fetzer Institute, Jewish Funds for Justice, Seeds of Justice, Unitarian Universalist Veatch Program and small family funds held an inaugural Transformative Leadership Awards and awarded six collaborative teams $30,000 and two finalists $5,000 for their work in the field.

== Influences ==
Transformative social change is influenced by the work of social movements led by individuals that are viewed as attending to both their personal or spiritual development as well as systemic social issues because of the "realization that action is not enough":

- Aung San Suu Kyi
- Mahatma Gandhi
- Martin Luther King Jr.
- Black Elk
- Thich Nhat Hanh

== Related work ==
In 2002, scholars Raymond Allen Morrow and Carlos Alberto Torres used the phrase transformative social change as part of the subtitle in their book Reading Freire and Habermas: Critical Pedagogy and Transformative Social Change as a term to convey the intersection between Paulo Freire's critical pedagogy and Jürgen Habermas' critical social theory, and the implications those convergences have for educational practice. However, the term is never specifically defined in the book, nor is any distinct theory set

Rev. Angel Kyodo Williams, who is credited by Harvard Divinity School with coining the name for the field, has connected personal inner transformation with collective social change and social justice work.

While transformative social change has evolved to include secular practices with no specific spiritual ties, its emphasis on collective liberation shares history, principles and proponents with spiritual activism and liberation spirituality. Likewise, it shares principles of transformative learning and transformative justice, Examples of "transformative practice" include: yoga, meditation, centering prayer, tai chi, forward stance and types of somatic practices.

Transformative community organizing is being taught in university courses, in fields such as social work, community health, sociology, and other service learning classes. Scholars such as Loretta Pyles have offered a transformative organizing framework, grounded in feminist social change work, and affirming a practice of collective and self-inquiry based on meditative traditions and social movement practices, such as popular education.

== See also ==
- Transformative justice
- Transformative learning
- Nonviolence
