= Civil Rights Movement Archive =

US non-profit organization

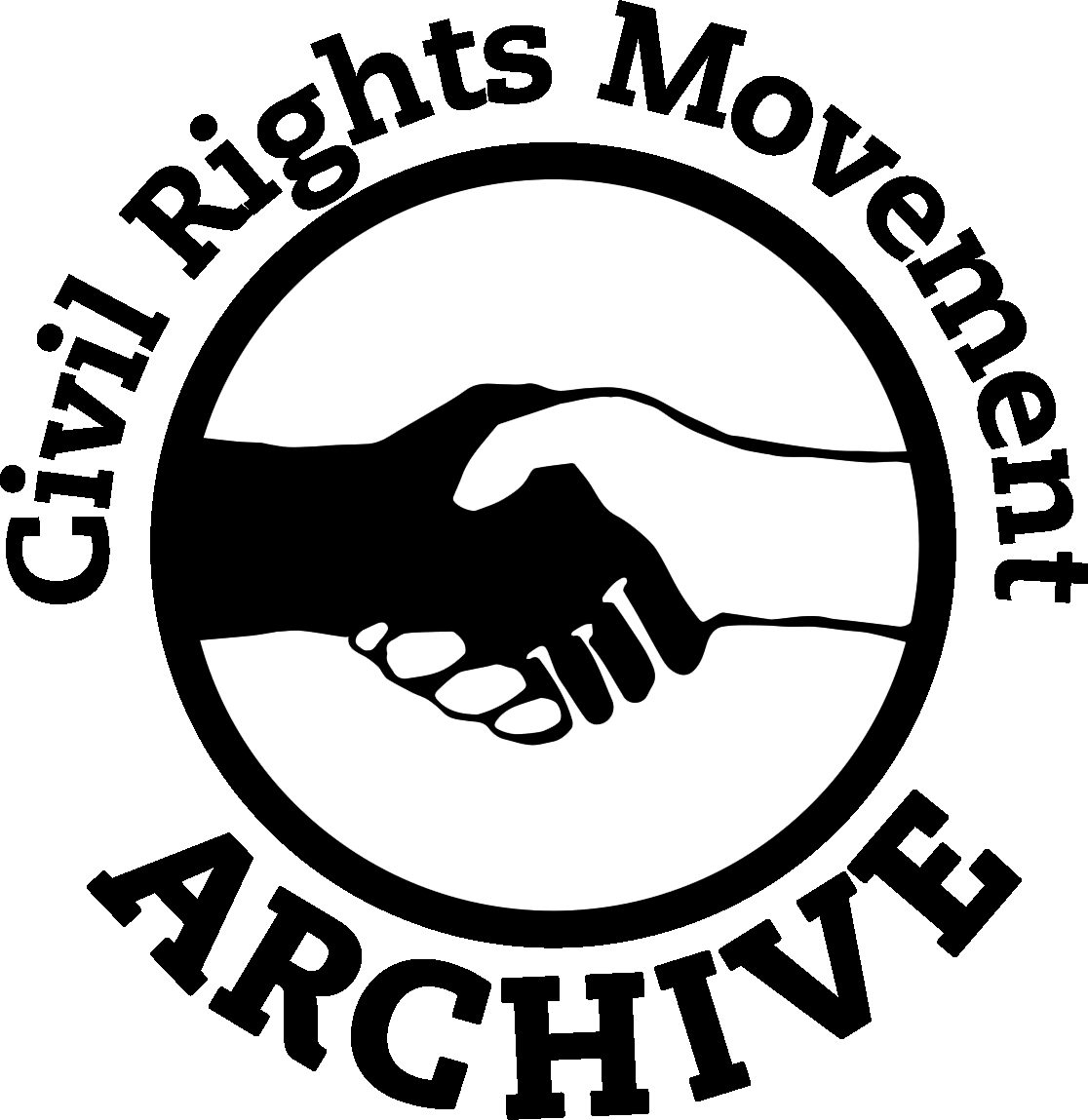
- Abbreviation: CRMA
- Formation: 1999
- Founder: Bruce Hartford
- Type: Nonprofit organization
- Purpose: Preserve and make available the history of the Civil Rights Movement
- Location: United States
- Services: Online archive of original source material
- Affiliations: African American Civil Rights Network (NPS); Duke University Libraries; SNCC Legacy Project (SLP); Zinn Education Project; Veterans of the MS Civil rights movement; SCOPE 50 Project
- Website: www.crmvet.org

The Civil Rights Movement Archive (CRMA) refers to both an online collection of materials about the American civil rights movement of the 1950s and 1960s (also known as the "Freedom Movement"), as well as the organization that created and maintains it. The collection provided by the CRMA includes materials from many parts of the civil rights movement, and "tells the history of the movement from the perspective of those who were there," an "up-from-below" and "inside-out" approach to history. The group behind the archive originally referred to themselves as the Civil Rights Movement Veterans, but in 2020 changed their name to the "Civil Rights Movement Archive" and applied to be a 501(c)(3) non-profit organization.

The organization now refers to itself as "CRMA" rather than "CRMVet". but the website can still can be found at "crmvet.org". Material from the CRMVet.org website has been cited in the past by The New York Times and other reputable publications.

== History ==
The CRMA was founded in 1999 as the "Civil Rights Movement Veterans Website" (known colloquially as "CRMVet"). At that time its primary purpose was to reconnect former movement activists with each other. To preserve movement-related memories and stories, CRMVet began collecting and making available narratives and interviews, original documents, speeches, photos, articles, and other material created by movement activists.

The archive evolved into an information resource for students, academics, authors, documentarians, and researchers. In recognition of its education and research role, CRMA has been added to the African American Civil Rights Network of the National Park Service.

In 2019, CRMVet changed its name to "Civil Rights Movement Archive" and in 2020 it incorporated as a California non-profit. It has also applied to become a 501(c)(3) non-profit organization.

In 2022 the CRMA signed a Memorandum of Understanding with [Duke University Libraries] designating them as the stewards who will preserve and sustain the CRMA when the current managers are no longer able to carry the work forward.

== Today ==
As of January 2023, the archive contains PDF-format scans and transcripts (PDF and HTML) of original materials from the era. It also provides photos and art work; stories, oral histories and commentaries by movement participants; contact information for speakers; and reference material. All of the archive's substantive content was created by participants and activists of the American civil rights movement in the 1950s and 1960s.

The archive is a primary source for pictures, events, documents, people, poetry, oral histories, commentaries and largely forgotten stories about the civil rights movement.

Many teachers use the archive as a resource. According to its founder, more than 279,000 people visited the CRMA website in 2022.

As of the end of 2022, the archive holdings included:

- 894 veteran stories, narratives, and oral histories
- 2000+ movement photos and art works
- 5092 original movement documents
- 1251 original letters and reports
- 538 original articles and speeches by movement veterans
- 289 history articles written by participants
- 331 commentaries on the movement and current events
- 71 transcribed discussions and panel presentations
- 234 movement-related poems
- A bibliography listing 706 books about the movement
- 1558 links, to other movement-related websites and pages
- Contact information for 683 movement veterans

The Civil Rights Movement Archive is funded by small donations from civil rights movement veterans and website users.

== Affiliations ==
During the 1960s, many people affiliated with the CRMA were involved with the Student Nonviolent Coordinating Committee (SNCC), the Congress of Racial Equality (CORE), and the Southern Christian Leadership Conference (SCLC). In the current era, the CRMA works in partnership with the "SNCC Legacy Project" and other organizations to preserve the history of the Southern Freedom Movement.

== See also ==
- Civil rights movement in popular culture
