= Constance Cumbey =

American lawyer, activist and writer (1944–2025)

Constance Elizabeth Cumbey (February 29, 1944 – June 9, 2025) was an American lawyer, Christian activist and writer.

== Life ==
Cumbey was born in Fort Wayne, Indiana, and became a Baptist as an adult, having been raised Seventh-day Adventist. She received her doctorate in law from Detroit College of Law in 1975 and held a number of roles, including with the Family Law Committee of the General Practice Section of the American Bar Association and the National Association of Women Lawyers. She died on June 9, 2025, at the age of 81.

== Views ==
Cumbey offered the first major criticism of the New Age movement from a Christian perspective in The Hidden Dangers of the Rainbow: The New Age Movement and Our Coming Age of Barbarism (1983), but quickly lost academic credibility due to her promotion of conspiracy theories linking the New Age movement to Benjamin Creme, Theosophy and Nazism. Scholar of New Age religion James R. Lewis describes this book as containing "a few few insightful criticisms with many accusations of the least responsible sort", and that she was "simply lumping together anything that departs from a rather strict interpretation of Christianity." Cumbey's accusations include that the New Age movement has "infiltrated all of Christianity, as well as Judaism", and that it is the motivating force behind ecumenism, holistic health centers, New Thought, humanistic psychology, Montessori schools, modernism, secular humanism, and zero population growth. She stated that Unitarian churches and health food stores become "New Age recruiting centers", that the Guardian Angels become one of the New Age movement's paramilitary organizations and that "the New Age Movement has complete identity with the programs of Hitler". Her contention was that the New Age movement is not simply expressing a naive or unscriptural interest in metaphysics, but that it is an organized conspiracy to overthrow the United States and replace it with a Nazi-like regime.

While there are certain superficial similarities among most religions, orthodox Judaism and Christianity stand in direct opposition to every other belief system. It is safe to say, however, that nearly all non-Judeo-Christian religions are extremely similar because, as the Bible indicates, they come from one source, the 'god of this world'—Satan himself.

— Constance Cumbey, The Hidden Dangers of the Rainbow

== Publications ==
- The New Age Movement: Age of Aquarius, Age of Antichrist. Oklahoma City: Southwest Radio Church. 1982. OCLC 45443844.
- The Hidden Dangers of the Rainbow: The New Age Movement and our Coming Age of Barbarism. Shreveport: Huntington House. 1983. ISBN 0-910311-03-X. OCLC 10038955.
- A Planned Deception: The Staging of a New Age Messiah. East Detroit: Pointe Publishers. 1985. ISBN 978-0935897005.
