= Radical centrism =

Political ideology

Radical centrism, also referred to as the radical center or the radical middle, is a concept that emerged in Western nations in the late 20th century. The radical in the term refers to a willingness on the part of most radical centrists to call for fundamental reform of institutions. According to writer John Avlon, centrism here refers to a belief that effective solutions require realism and pragmatism, not just idealism and emotion. Radical-centrist author Mark Satin defines radical centrism as "idealism without illusions", a phrase originally used by John F. Kennedy.

Radical centrists borrow ideas from the political left and the political right, often melding them. Most support market economy-based solutions to social problems, with strong governmental oversight in the public interest. There is support for increased global engagement and the growth of an empowered middle class in developing countries. Some observers see radical centrism as primarily a process of catalyzing dialogue and fresh thinking among polarized people and groups.

Several countries, including Armenia, Canada, Chile, France, and South Korea, have witnessed the emergence of political parties or prominent politicians who have been characterized as radical centrists. In the United States, many radical centrists work within the major political parties; they also support independent or third-party initiatives and candidacies.

One common criticism of radical centrism is that its policies are only marginally different from conventional centrist policies.

== Influences and precursors ==
Some influences on radical centrist political philosophy are not directly political. Robert C. Solomon, a philosopher with radical-centrist interests, identifies a number of philosophical concepts supporting balance, reconciliation or synthesis, including Confucius' concept of ren, Aristotle's concept of the mean, Desiderius Erasmus's and Michel de Montaigne's humanism, Giambattista Vico's evolutionary vision of history, William James' and John Dewey's pragmatism, (Note: For an extended discussion of neoclassical American pragmatism and its possible political implications, see Louis Menand's book The Metaphysical Club.) and Aurobindo Ghose's integration of opposites. (Note: An international evangelical movement, the Association of Vineyard Churches, describes itself as "radical middle" because it believes that spiritual truth is found by holding supposedly contradictory concepts in tension. Examples include head vs. heart, planning vs. being Spirit-led, and standing for truth vs. standing for Unity.)

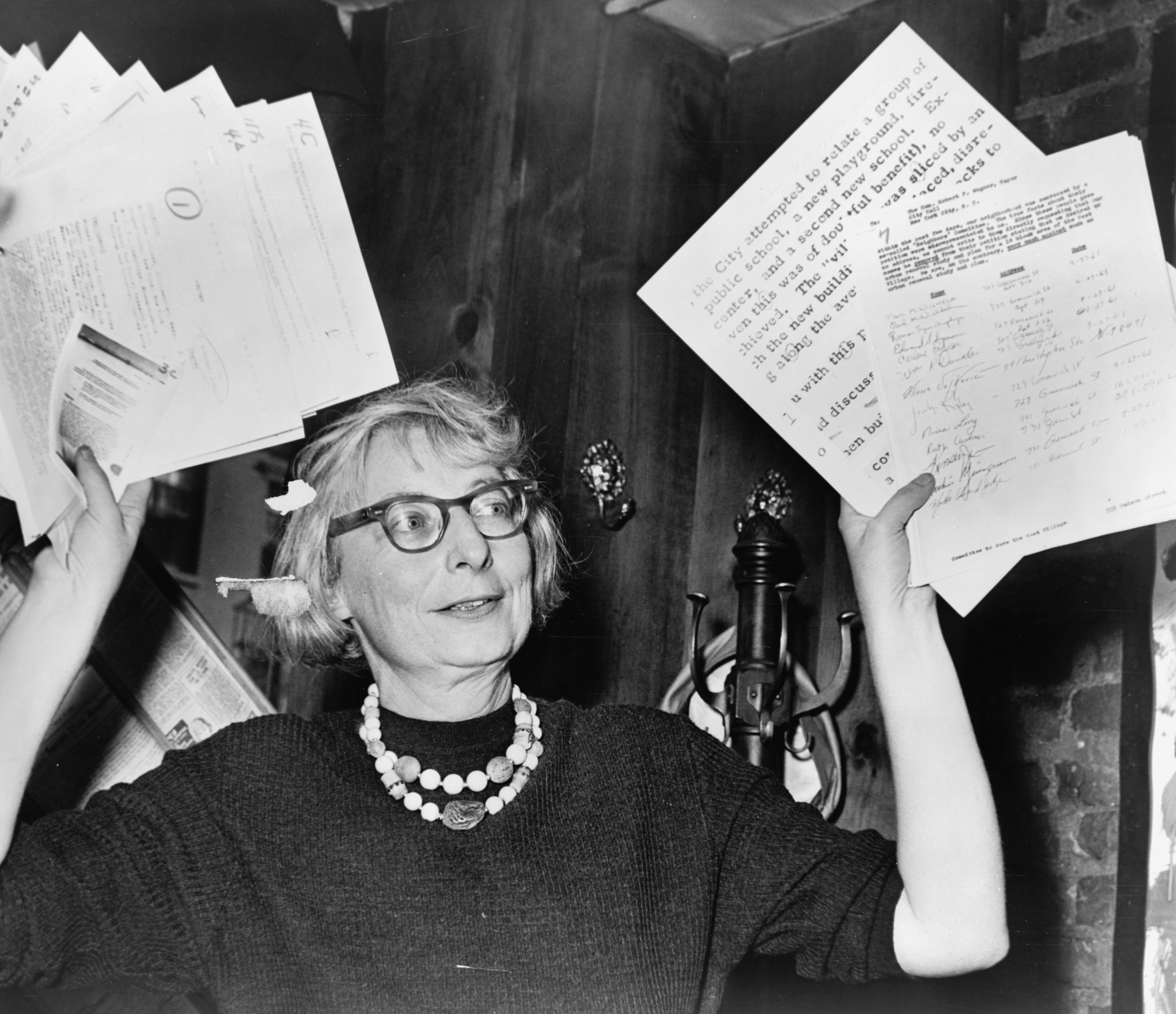
Urban theorist and activist Jane Jacobs (1916–2006), who has been described as "proto-radical middle"

However, most commonly cited influences and precursors are from the political realm. For example, British radical-centrist politician Nick Clegg considers himself an heir to political theorist John Stuart Mill, former Liberal Prime Minister David Lloyd George, economist John Maynard Keynes, social reformer William Beveridge and former Liberal Party leader Jo Grimond. The single tax movement, developed in the 19th century by Henry George and others, has long attracted thinkers and activists from all sides of the political spectrum. In his book Independent Nation (2004), John Avlon discusses precursors of 21st-century U.S. political centrism, including President Theodore Roosevelt, Supreme Court Justice Earl Warren, Senator Daniel Patrick Moynihan, Senator Margaret Chase Smith, and Senator Edward Brooke. Radical centrist writer Mark Satin points to political influences from outside the electoral arena, including communitarian thinker Amitai Etzioni, magazine publisher Charles Peters, management theorist Peter Drucker, city planning theorist Jane Jacobs and futurists Heidi and Alvin Toffler. (Note: In the 1980s, Satin's own Washington, D.C.-based political newsletter, New Options, described itself as "post-liberal". Culture critic Annie Gottlieb says it urged the New Left and New Age to "evolve into a 'New Center'".) Satin calls Benjamin Franklin the radical middle's favorite Founding Father since he was "extraordinarily practical", "extraordinarily creative" and managed to "get the warring factions and wounded egos to transcend their differences".

== Late 20th-century groundwork ==
=== Initial definitions ===
According to journalist William Safire, the phrase "radical middle" was coined by Renata Adler, a staff writer for The New Yorker. In the introduction to her second collection of essays, Toward a Radical Middle (1969), she presented it as a healing radicalism. Adler said it rejected the violent posturing and rhetoric of the 1960s in favor of such "corny" values as "reason, decency, prosperity, human dignity [and human] contact". She called for the "reconciliation" of the white working class and African-Americans.

In the 1970s, sociologist Donald I. Warren described the radical center as consisting of those "middle American radicals" who were suspicious of big government, the national media and academics, as well as rich people and predatory corporations. Although they might vote for Democrats or Republicans, or for populists like George Wallace, they felt politically homeless and were looking for leaders who would address their concerns. (Note: Warren's book influenced Michael Lind and other 21st century radical centrists.)

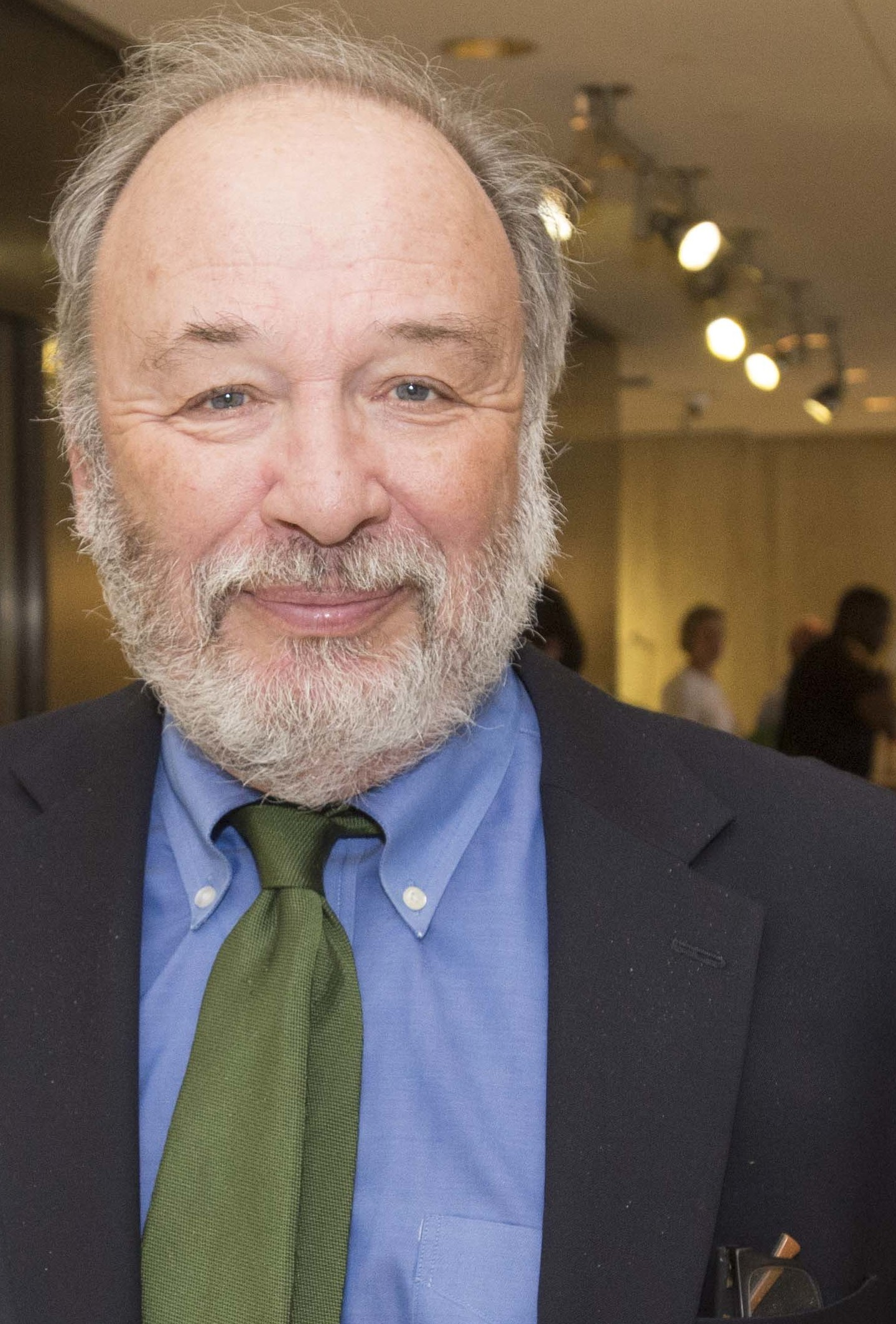
Joe Klein, who wrote the Newsweek cover story "Stalking the Radical Middle"

In the 1980s and 1990s, several authors contributed their understandings to the concept of the radical center. For example, futurist Marilyn Ferguson added a holistic dimension to the concept when she said: "[The] Radical Center ... is not neutral, not middle-of-the-road, but a view of the whole road". (Note: Two years later, another prominent futurist, John Naisbitt, wrote in bolded type, "The political left and right are dead; all the action is being generated by a radical center".) Sociologist Alan Wolfe located the creative part of the political spectrum at the center: "The extremes of right and left know where they stand, while the center furnishes what is original and unexpected". African-American theorist Stanley Crouch upset many political thinkers when he pronounced himself a "radical pragmatist". Crouch explained: "I affirm whatever I think has the best chance of working, of being both inspirational and unsentimental, of reasoning across the categories of false division and beyond the decoy of race".

In his influential 1995 Newsweek cover story "Stalking the Radical Middle", journalist Joe Klein described radical centrists as angrier and more frustrated than conventional Democrats and Republicans. Klein said they share four broad goals: getting money out of politics, balancing the budget, restoring civility and figuring out how to run government better. He also said their concerns were fueling "what is becoming a significant intellectual movement, nothing less than an attempt to replace the traditional notions of liberalism and conservatism". (Note: Subsequent to Klein's article, some political writers posited the existence of two radical centers, one neopopulist and bitter and the other moderate and comfortable. According to historian Sam Tanenhaus, one of the strengths of Ted Halstead and Michael Lind's book The Radical Center (2001) is it attempts to weld the two supposed radical-centrist factions together.) (Note: A 1991 story in Time magazine with a similar title, "Looking for The Radical Middle", revealed the existence of a "New Paradigm Society" in Washington, D.C., a group of high-level liberal and conservative activists seeking ways to bridge the ideological divide. The article discusses what it describes as the group's virtual manifesto, E. J. Dionne's book Why Americans Hate Politics.)

=== Relations to the Third Way ===
In 1998, British sociologist Anthony Giddens claimed that the radical centre is synonymous with the Third Way. For Giddens, an advisor to former British Prime Minister Tony Blair and for many other European political actors, the Third Way is a reconstituted form of social democracy.

Some radical centrist thinkers do not equate radical centrism with the Third Way. In Britain, many do not see themselves as social democrats. Most prominently, British radical-centrist politician Nick Clegg has made it clear he does not consider himself an heir to Tony Blair; further, Richard Reeves, Clegg's longtime advisor, emphatically rejects social democracy.

In the United States, the situation is different because the term Third Way was adopted by the Democratic Leadership Council and other moderate Democrats. However, most U.S. radical centrists also avoid the term. Ted Halstead and Michael Lind's introduction to radical centrist politics fails to mention it and Lind subsequently accused the organized moderate Democrats of siding with the "center-right" and Wall Street. Radical centrists have expressed dismay with what they see as "split[ting] the difference", "triangulation" and other supposed practices of what some of them call the "mushy middle". (Note: In 2010, radical centrist Michael Lind stated that "to date, President Obama has been the soft-spoken tribune of the mushy middle".)

== 21st-century overviews ==
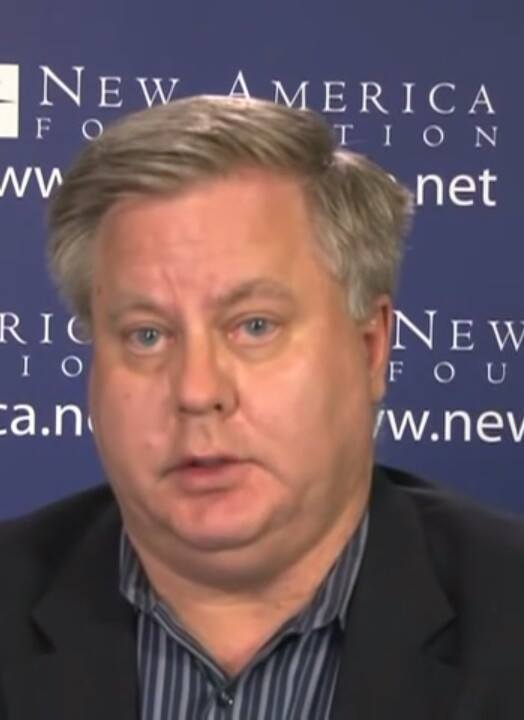
Michael Lind, co-author of The Radical Center: The Future of American Politics

The first years of the 21st century saw publication of four introductions to radical centrist politics: Ted Halstead and Michael Lind's The Radical Center (2001), Matthew Miller's The Two Percent Solution (2003), John Avlon's Independent Nation (2004) and Mark Satin's Radical Middle (2004). These books attempted to take the concept of radical centrism beyond the stage of "cautious gestures" and journalistic observation and define it as a political philosophy. (Note: Shortly after the four books appeared, economist Leonard Santow and historian Mark Santow summarized the perspective in a book for policy analysts: "[A]n interesting way of thinking has emerged in some quarters, offering the notion of a politics of the 'radical middle'. Articulated most persuasively by Michael Lind and Mark Satin, this politics seeks to go beyond the 'left' and the 'right' by drawing on the best of both of them. … The primary concern of such a politics would be to work through and improve our basic institutions of representative democracy and capitalism in order to provide a fair start in life for all citizens … [and] grapple with big, long-term challenges".)

The authors came to their task from diverse political backgrounds: Avlon had been a speechwriter for New York Republican Mayor Rudolph Giuliani; Miller had been a business consultant before serving in President Bill Clinton's budget office; Lind had been an exponent of Harry Truman-style "national liberalism"; Halstead had run a think tank called Redefining Progress; and Satin had co-drafted the U.S. Green Party's foundational political statement, "Ten Key Values". However, there is a generational bond: all these authors were between 31 and 41 years of age when their books were published (except for Satin, who was nearing 60).

While the four books do not speak with one voice, among them they express assumptions, analyses, policies and strategies that helped set the parameters for radical centrism as a 21st-century political philosophy:

=== Assumptions ===
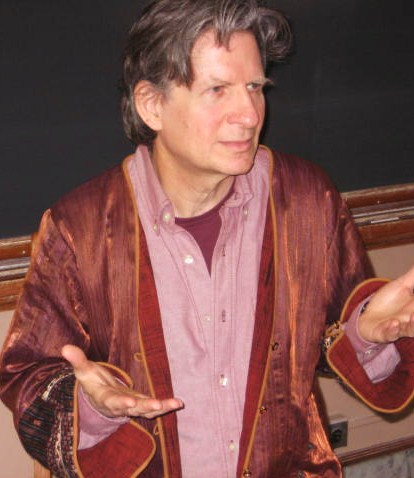
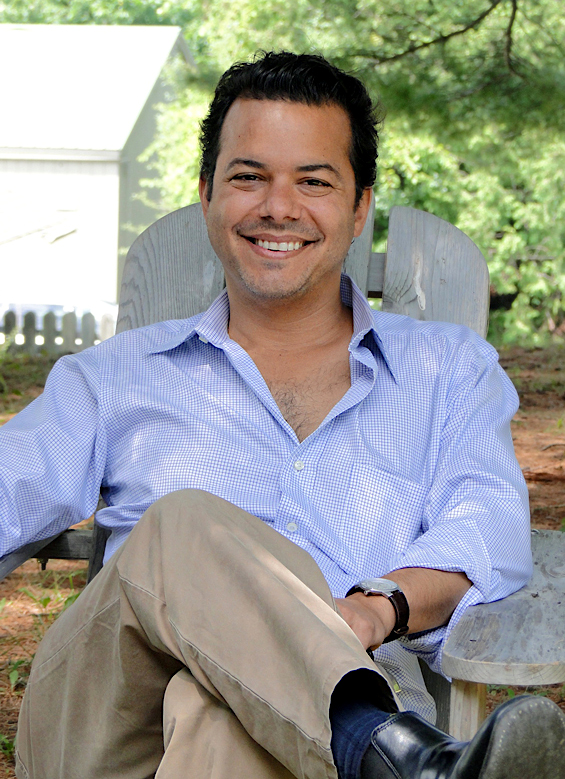
Former Green activist Mark Satin (left) and former Republican activist John Avlon (right), two early 21st-century radical centrist authors
- Our problems cannot be solved by twiddling the dials; substantial reforms are needed in many areas.
- Solving our problems will not require massive infusions of new money.
- However, solving our problems will require drawing on the best ideas from left and right and wherever else they may be found.
- It will also require creative and original ideas – thinking outside the box.
- Such thinking cannot be divorced from the world as it is, or from tempered understandings of human nature. A mixture of idealism and realism is needed. "Idealism without realism is impotent", says John Avlon. "Realism without idealism is empty".

=== Analysis ===
- North America and Western Europe have entered an Information Age economy, with new possibilities that are barely being tapped.
- In this new age, a plurality of people is neither liberal nor conservative, but independent and looking to move in a more appropriate direction.
- Nevertheless, the major political parties are committed to ideas developed in, and for, a different era; and are unwilling or unable to realistically address the future.
- Most people in the Information Age want to maximize the amount of choice they have in their lives.
- In addition, people are insisting that they be given a fair opportunity to succeed in the new world they are entering.

=== General policies ===
- An overriding commitment to fiscal responsibility, even if it entails means testing of social programs.
- An overriding commitment to reforming public education, whether by equalizing spending on school districts, offering school choice, hiring better teachers, or empowering existing principals and teachers.
- A commitment to market-based solutions in health care, energy, the environment, etc., so long as the solutions are carefully regulated by government to serve the public good. The policy goal, says Matthew Miller, is to "harness market forces for public purposes".
- A commitment to provide jobs for everyone willing to work, whether by subsidizing jobs in the private sector or by creating jobs in the public sector.
- A commitment to need-based rather than race-based affirmative action; more generally, a commitment to race-neutral ideals.
- A commitment to participate in institutions and processes of global governance, and be of genuine assistance to people in the developing nations.

=== Strategy ===
- A new political majority can be built, whether it be seen to consist largely of Avlon's political independents, Satin's "caring persons", Miller's balanced and pragmatic individuals, or Halstead and Lind's triad of disaffected voters, enlightened business leaders, and young people.
- National political leadership is important; local and nonprofit activism is not enough.
- Political process reform is also important – for example, implementing rank-order voting in elections and providing free media time to candidates.
- A radical centrist party should be created, assuming one of the major parties cannot simply be won over by radical centrist thinkers and activists. (Note: Matthew Miller added an "Afterword" to the paperback edition of his book favoring formation of a "transformational third party" by the year 2010, if the two major parties remained stuck in their ways.)
- In the meantime, particular independent, major-party or third-party candidacies should be supported.

== Idea creation and dissemination ==
Along with publication of the four overviews of radical centrist politics, the first part of the 21st century saw a rise in the creation and dissemination of radical centrist policy ideas.

=== Think tanks and mass media ===
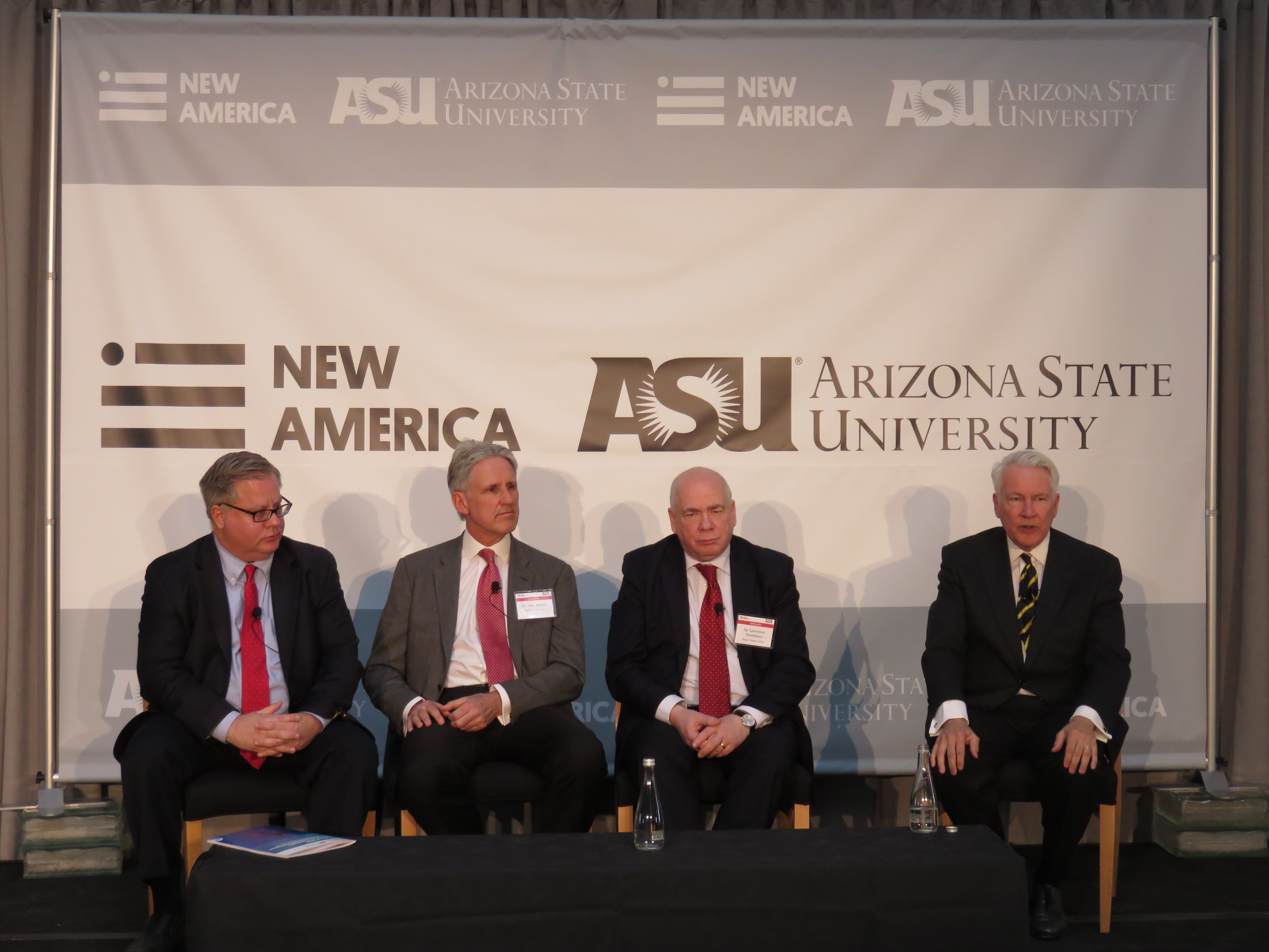
2015 panel discussion at the New America think tank in Washington, D.C.

Several think tanks are developing radical centrist ideas. By the early 2000s, these included Demos in Britain; the Cape York Institute for Policy and Leadership in Australia; and New America (formerly the New America Foundation) in the United States. New America was started by authors Ted Halstead and Michael Lind, as well as two others, to bring radical centrist ideas to Washington, D.C. journalists and policy researchers. (Note: Besides Halstead and Lind, thinkers affiliated with the New America Foundation in the early 2000s included Katherine Boo, Steven Clemons, James Fallows, Maya MacGuineas, Walter Russell Mead, James Pinkerton, Jedediah Purdy, and Sherle Schwenninger.)

In the 2010s, new think tanks began promoting radical centrist ideas. "Radix: Think Tank for the Radical Centre" was established in London in 2016; its initial board of trustees included former Liberal Democrat leader Nick Clegg. Writing in The Guardian, Radix policy director David Boyle called for "big, radical ideas" that could break with both trickle-down conservatism and backward-looking socialism. In 2018, a policy document released by the then four-year-old Niskanen Center of Washington, D.C. was characterized as a "manifesto for radical centrism" by Big Think writer Paul Ratner. According to Ratner, the document – signed by some of Niskanen's executives and policy analysts – is an attempt to "incorporate rival ideological positions into a way forward" for America.

A radical centrist perspective can also be found in major periodicals. In the United States, for example, The Washington Monthly was started by early radical centrist thinker Charles Peters (Note: Peters used the term "neoliberal" to distinguish his ideas from those of neoconservatives and conventional liberals. His version of neoliberalism is separate from what came to be known internationally as neoliberalism.) and many large-circulation magazines publish articles by New America fellows. Columnists who have written from a radical centrist perspective include John Avlon, Thomas Friedman, Joe Klein, and Matthew Miller. Prominent journalists James Fallows and Fareed Zakaria have been identified as radical centrists.

Bari Weiss, co-founder of The Free Press, has described herself as a "radical centrist". In 2025 she was named editor-in-chief of CBS News.

In Britain, the news magazine The Economist positions itself as radical centrist. An editorial ("leader") in 2012 declared in bolded type: "A new form of radical centrist politics is needed to tackle inequality without hurting economic growth". An essay on The Economist's website the following year, introduced by the editor, argues that the magazine had always "com[e] ... from what we like to call the radical centre".

=== Books on specific topics ===
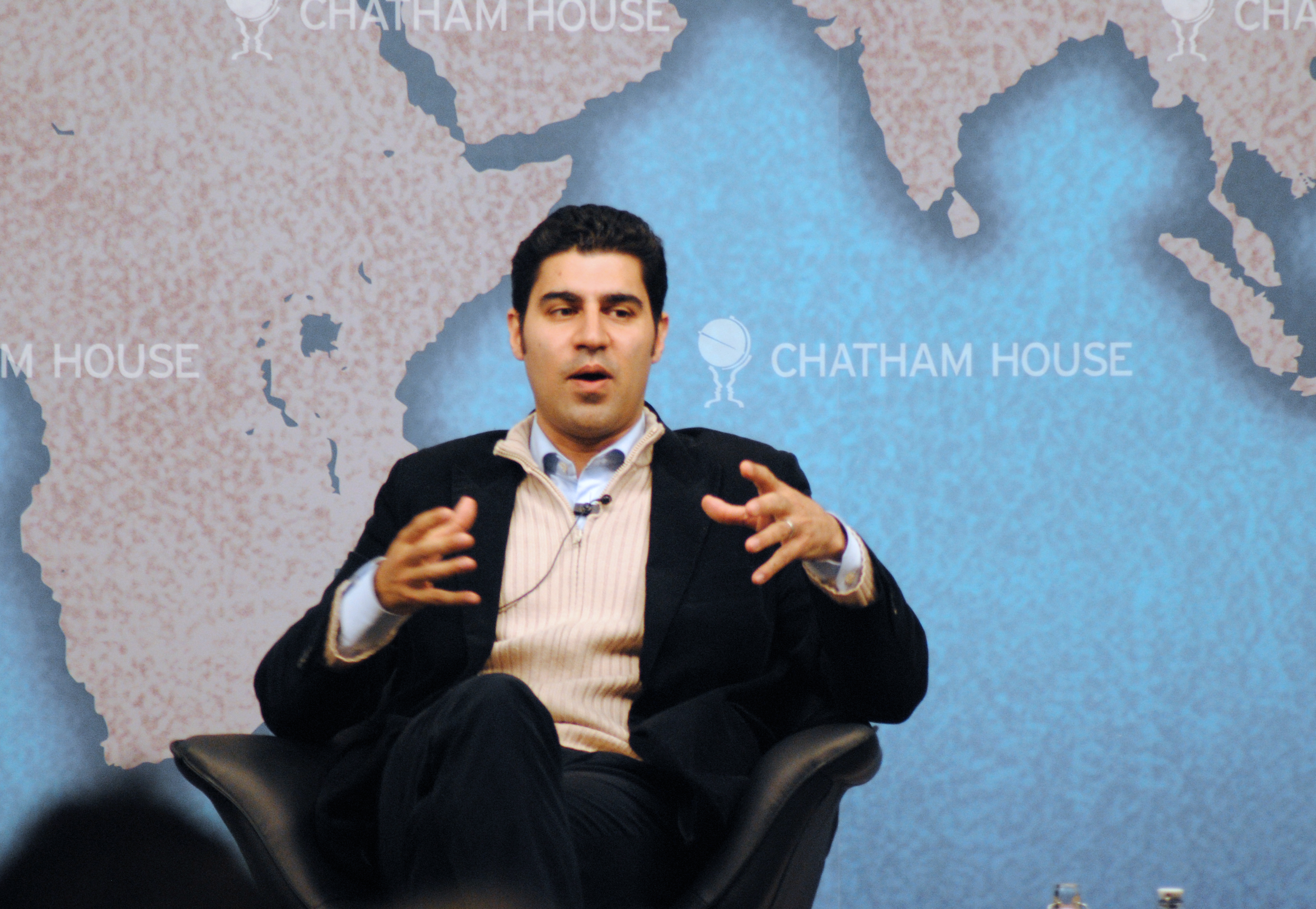
Parag Khanna speaks on his book How to Run the World: Charting a Course to the Next Renaissance.

Many books now offer radical centrist perspectives on specific topics, including foreign policy, the environment, agriculture, race, women and men, bureaucracy, economics, international relations, political dialogue, political organizing, and personal action. One such book on each of these topics follows, in order:

- In Ethical Realism (2006), British liberal Anatol Lieven and U.S. conservative John Hulsman advocate a foreign policy based on modesty, principle and seeing ourselves as others see us.
- In Break Through (2007), environmental strategists Ted Nordhaus and Michael Shellenberger of the Breakthrough Institute call on activists to become more comfortable with pragmatism, high-technology and aspirations for human greatness.
- In Food from the Radical Center (2018), ecologist Gary Paul Nabhan proposes agricultural policies intended to unite left and right as well as improve the food supply.
- In Winning the Race (2005), linguist John McWhorter says that many African Americans are negatively affected by a cultural phenomenon he calls "therapeutic alienation".
- In Unfinished Business (2016), Anne-Marie Slaughter of New America rethinks feminist assumptions and presents new visions of how women and men can flourish.
- In Try Common Sense (2019), attorney Philip K. Howard urges the national government to set broad goals and standards, and leave interpretation to those closest to the ground. (Note: Howard summarized Try Common Sense in an article entitled "A Radical Centrist Platform for 2020.")
- In The Origin of Wealth (2006), Eric Beinhocker of the Institute for New Economic Thinking portrays the economy as a dynamic but imperfectly self-regulating evolutionary system and suggests policies that could support benign socio-economic evolution.
- In How to Run the World (2011), scholar Parag Khanna argues that the emerging world order should not be run from the top down, but by a galaxy of nonprofit, nation-state, corporate and individual actors cooperating for their mutual benefit.
- In The Righteous Mind (2012), social psychologist Jonathan Haidt says we can conduct useful political dialogue only after acknowledging the strengths in our opponents' ways of thinking.
- In Voice of the People (2008), conservative activist Lawrence Chickering and liberal attorney James Turner attempt to lay the groundwork for a grassroots "transpartisan" movement across the U.S.
- In his memoir Radical Middle: Confessions of an Accidental Revolutionary (2010), South African journalist Denis Beckett tries to show that one person can make a difference in a situation many might regard as hopeless.

== Political action around the world ==
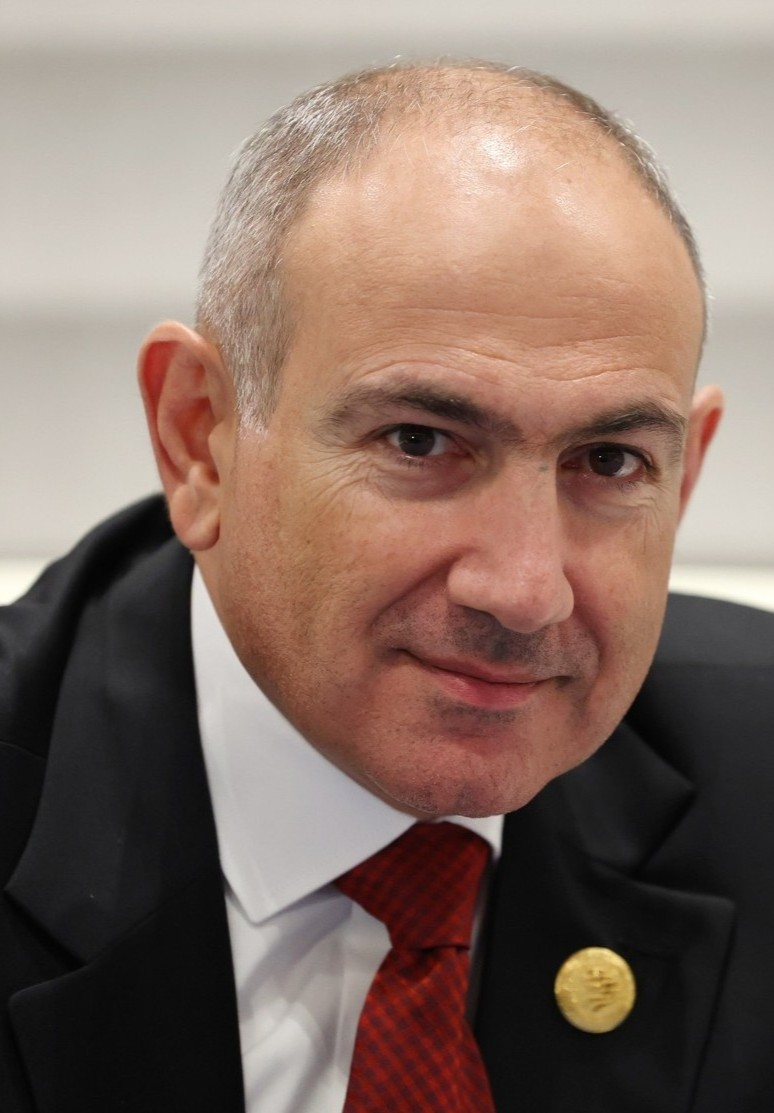
Nikol Pashinyan of Armenia, 2025

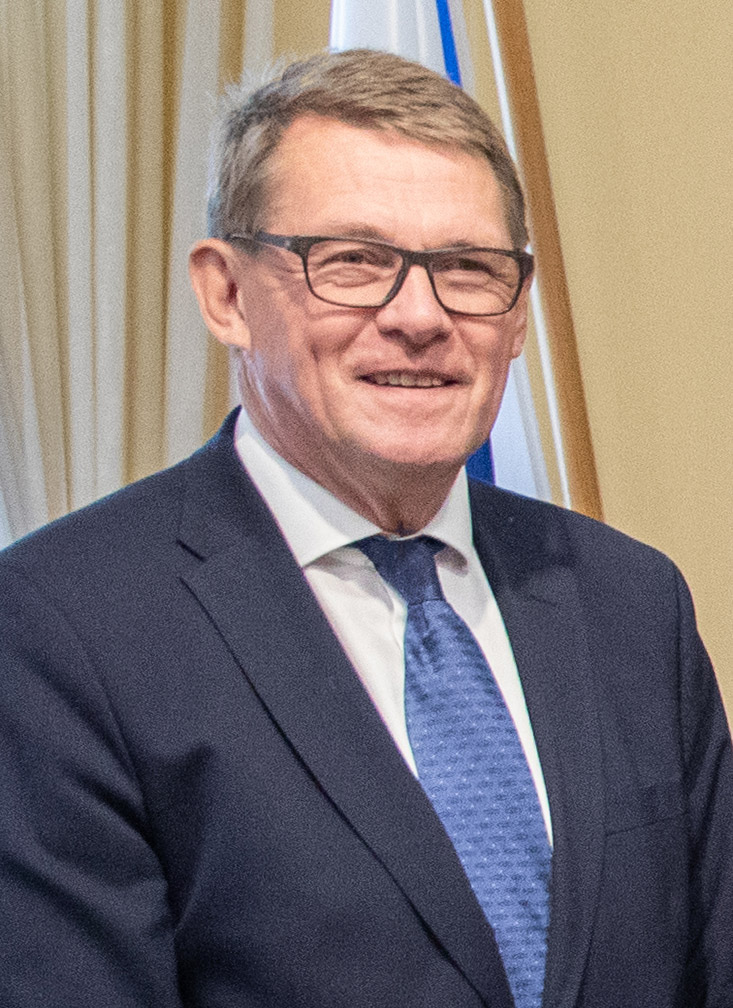
Matti Vanhanen of Finland, 2022

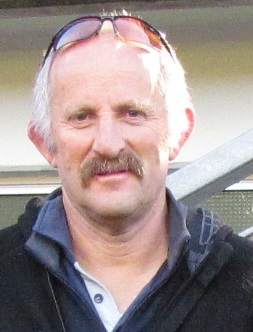
Gareth Morgan of New Zealand, 2012

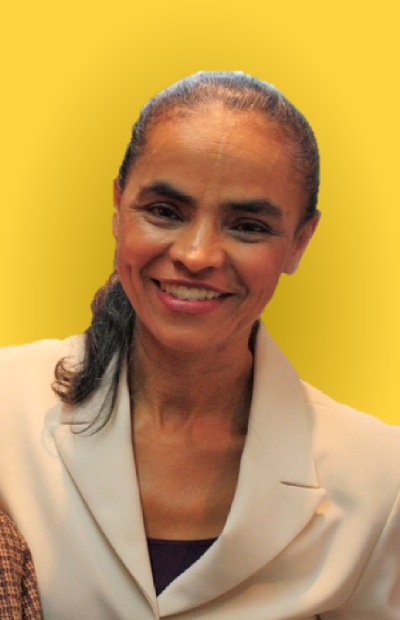
Marina Silva of Brazil, 2014

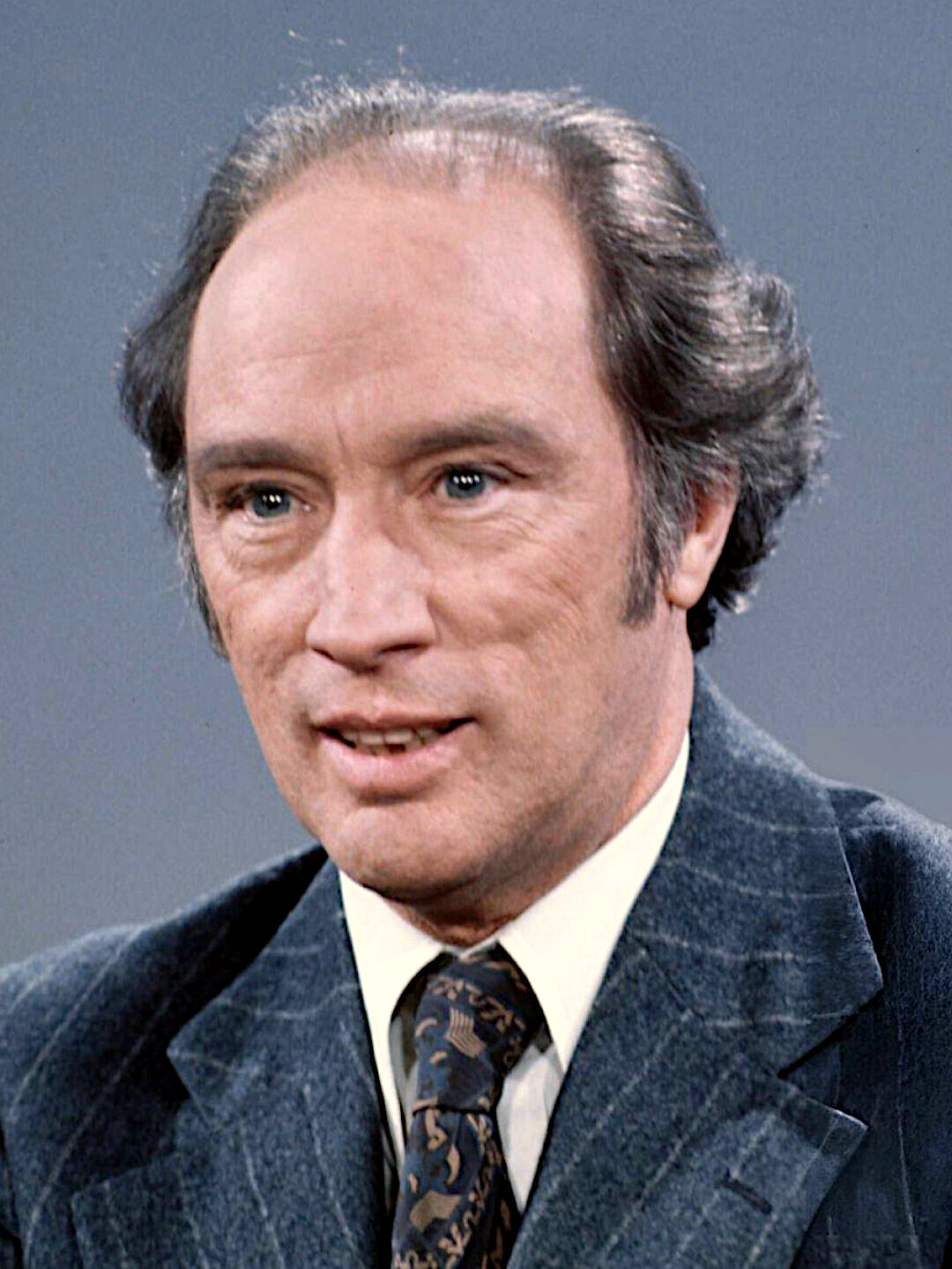
Pierre Trudeau of Canada, 1975

Radical centrists have been and continue to be engaged in a variety of political activities.

=== Armenia ===
Prime Minister of Armenia, Nikol Pashinyan has been described as a radical centrist. His Civil Contract party won a supermajority of seats in the National Assembly following the 2021 Armenian parliamentary election.

=== Australia ===
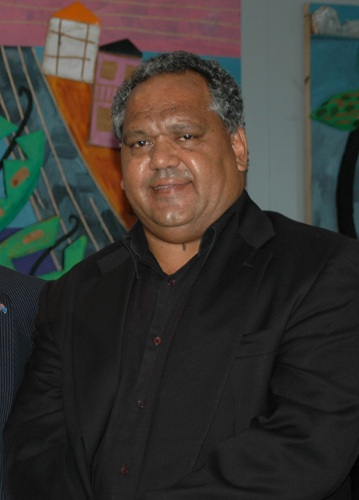
Noel Pearson in 2010

In Australia, Aboriginal lawyer Noel Pearson bases his ideas on an explicitly radical centrist movement among Aboriginal and Torres Strait Islander peoples. The movement is seeking more assistance from the Australian state, but is also seeking to convince individual Aboriginal people to take more responsibility for their lives. To political philosopher Katherine Curchin, writing in the Australian Journal of Political Science, Pearson is attempting something unusual and worthwhile: casting public debate on Indigenous issues in terms of a search for a radical centre. She says Pearson's methods have much in common with those of deliberative democracy. After prime minister Malcolm Turnbull's rejection of the call for a referendum about Indigenous constitutional recognition contained in the Uluru Statement from the Heart in 2017, Pearson wrote that he had finally ended his "long game" of developing an agenda for the "radical centre", calling it "a long and dirty experiment that failed".

Shireen Morris, director of the Radical Centre Reform Lab at Macquarie University Law School, a mentee of Pearson, wrote that the Indigenous Voice to Parliament (which failed in a referendum in 2023) was developed as a radical centrist solution to the problem of constitutional recognition for Indigenous Australians. It attempted to synthesise progressive concerns that constitutional recognition must involve structural reform and not "mere symbolism" with conservative concerns that any change must not limit parliamentary sovereignty and "minimise legal uncertainty". However, in her view, the conservative history behind the Voice campaign was overtaken by the left, with the Albanese Labor government leading the push for the yes vote.

While not using the term formally, the political party Science Party is founded on principles that are typical of the radical centre.

=== Brazil ===
In the late 2010s, Brazil's Marina Silva was identified by The Economist as an emerging radical-centrist leader. Formerly a member of the left-wing Workers' Party, by 2017 she had organized a new party whose watchwords included environmentalism, liberalism, and "clean politics". She had already served six years as Minister of the Environment, and in 2010 she was the Green Party candidate for President of Brazil, finishing third with 20% of the vote.

The Social Democratic Party, a breakaway of the Democrats founded in 2011, is a self-described radical centrist party.

=== Canada ===
In the late 1970s, Prime Minister Pierre Elliott Trudeau claimed that his Liberal Party adhered to the "radical centre". One thing this means, Trudeau said, is that "sometimes we have to fight against the state". Paul Hellyer, who served in Trudeau's first cabinet and spent over half a century in Canadian political life, (Note: In 1997, forty-eight years after first being elected to the Canadian Parliament, Hellyer founded a minor political party, the Canadian Action Party.) said in 2010, "I have been branded as everything from far left to far right. I put myself in the radical centre – one who seeks solutions to problems based on first principles without regard to ideology. I believe that it is the kind of solution the world desperately needs at a time when niggling change or fine tuning is not good enough".

=== Chile ===
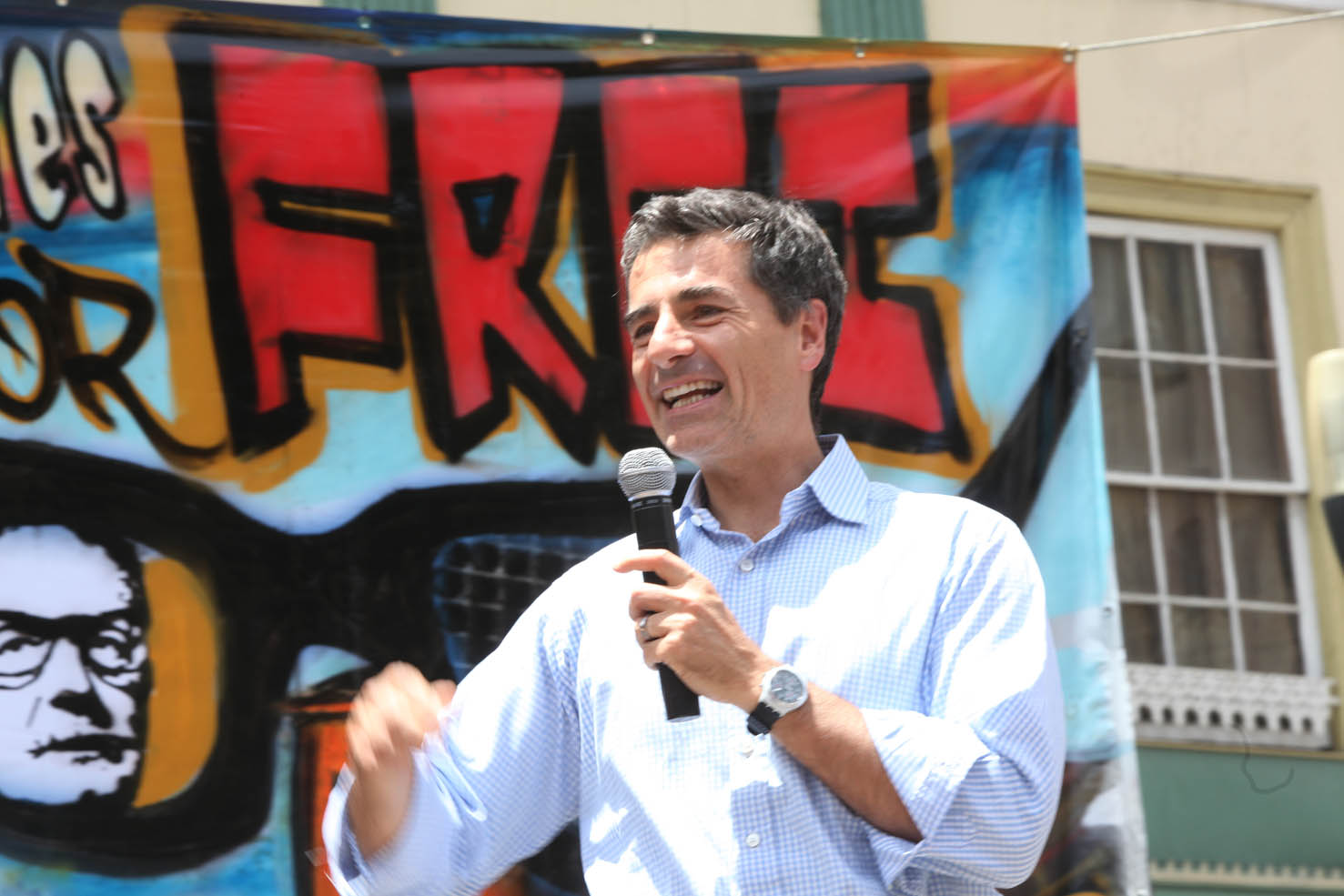
Andrés Velasco speaking at a rally in 2009

In 2017, The Economist described Chile's Andrés Velasco as a rising radical-centrist politician. A former finance minister in Michelle Bachelet's first government, he later unsuccessfully ran against her for the presidential nomination and then helped establish a new political party. According to The Economist, Velasco and his colleagues say they support a political philosophy that is both liberal and egalitarian. Like Amartya Sen, they see freedom not just as freedom-from, but as the absence of domination and the opportunity to fulfill one's potential. Like John Rawls, they reject the far left's emphasis on state redistribution in favor of an emphasis on equal treatment for all with special vigilance against class- and race-based discrimination.

=== Finland ===
Finland's Centre Party has been generally viewed as a radical centrist party, with wide-ranging views from the left and right-wing political spectrums, such as supporting lower taxes for businesses and lowering the capital gains tax, while also encompassing strong welfare and environmental policies and legislation. The Centre Party's former chairmen and Finland's former Prime Ministers, Juha Sipilä and Matti Vanhanen as well as former President Urho Kekkonen have been viewed as radical centrists.

=== France ===
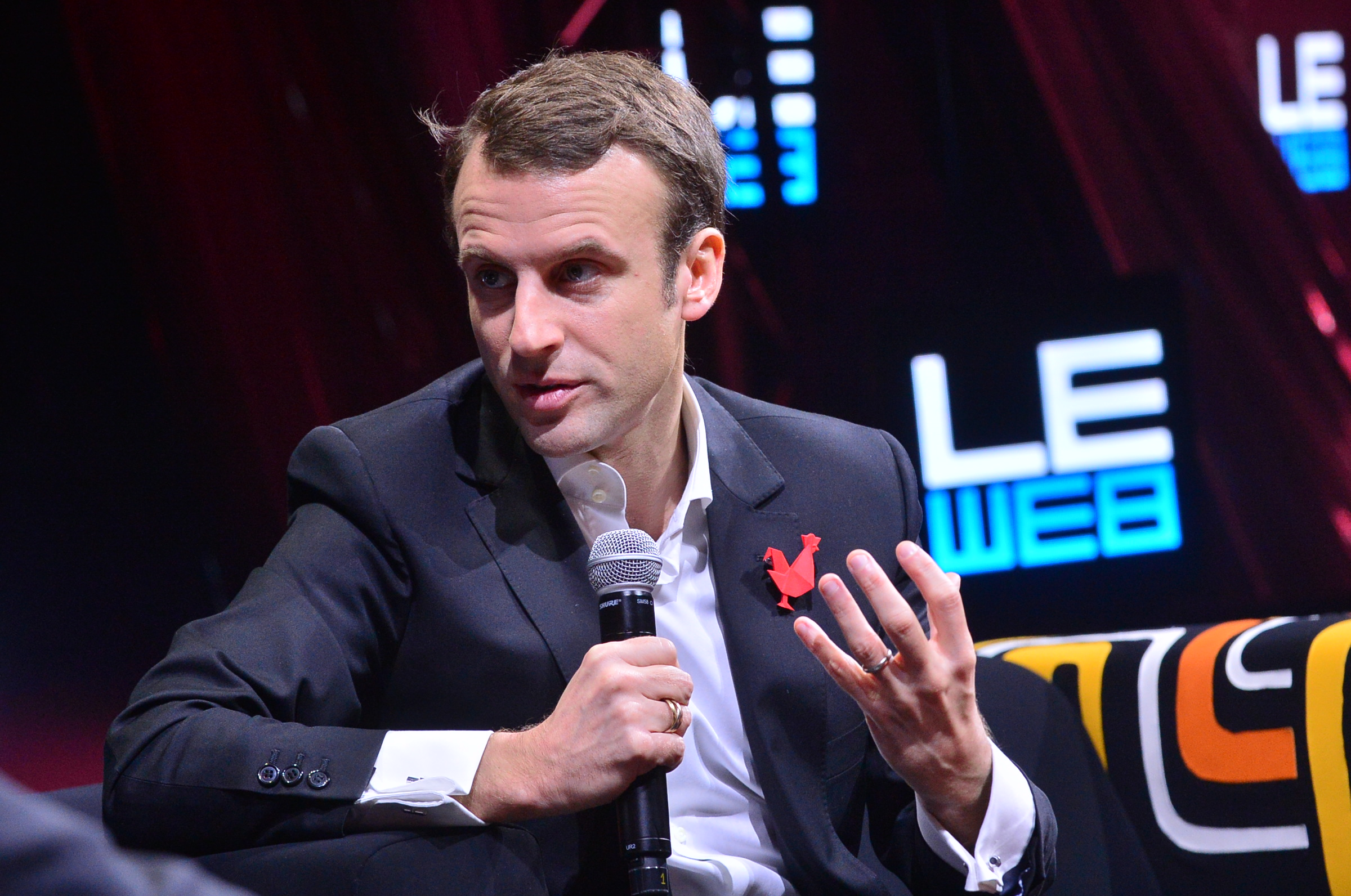
Emmanuel Macron speaking at a conference in 2014

Several observers have identified Emmanuel Macron, elected President of France in 2017, as a radical centrist. Anne Applebaum of The Washington Post says Macron "represents the brand-new radical center", as does his political movement, En Marche!, which Applebaum translates as "forward". She notes a number of politically bridging ideas Macron holds – for example, "He embraces markets, but says he believes in 'collective solidarity'". A professor of history, Robert Zaretsky, writing in Foreign Policy, argues that Macron's radical centrism is "the embodiment of a particularly French kind of center – the extreme center". He points to Macron's declaration that he is "neither left nor right", and to his support for policies, such as public-sector austerity and major environmental investments that traditional political parties might find contradictory.

U.S. politician Dave Anderson, writing in The Hill newspaper, says that Macron's election victory points the way for those "who wish to transcend their polarized politics of [the present] in the name of a new center, not a moderate center associated with United States and United Kingdom 'Third Way' politics but what has been described as Macron's 'radical center' point of view. … [It] transcends left and right but takes important elements of both sides".

=== Germany ===
Writing at The Dahrendorf Forum, a joint project of the Hertie School of Governance (Berlin) and the London School of Economics, Forum fellow Alexandru Filip put the German Green party of 2018 in the same camp as Emmanuel Macron's French party (see above) and Albert Rivera's Spanish one (see below). His article "On New and Radical Centrism" argued that the Greens did relatively well in the 2017 German federal election not only because of their stance against the "system" but also as a result of "a more centrist, socio-liberal, pro-European constituency that felt alienated by the power-sharing cartel" of the larger parties.

=== Israel ===
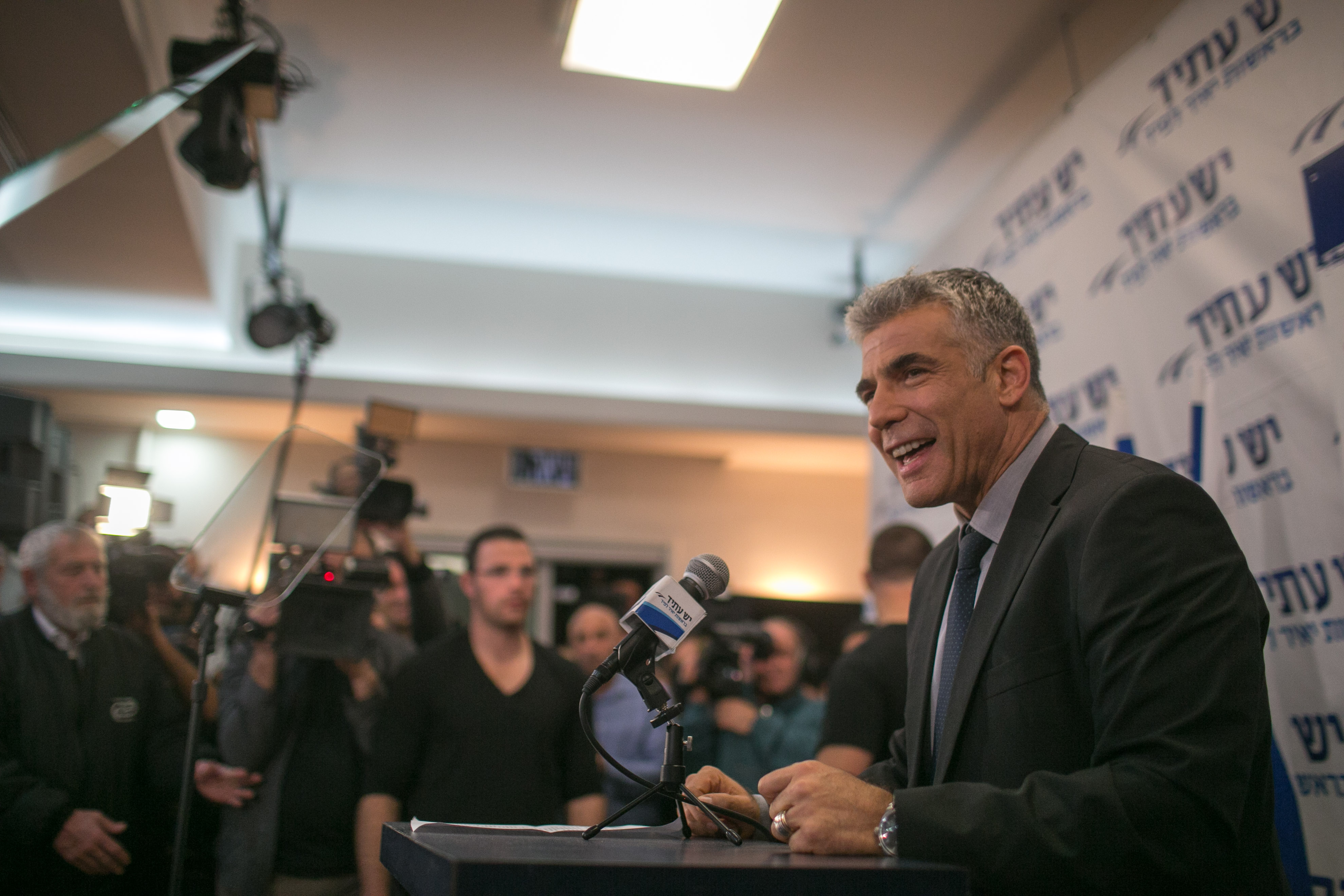
Yair Lapid addressing supporters on election night in 2013

In an article for Israel Hayom in 2012, conservative Knesset member Tzipi Hotovely named Israeli politician Yair Lapid and his Yesh Atid (There Is a Future) party as examples of "the radical center" in Israel, which she warned her readers against. In 2013, Yossi Klein Halevi – author of books addressing Israelis and Palestinians alike – explained why he voted for Lapid, saying, in part:

He emerged as the voice of middle class disaffection, yet included in his [party] list two Ethiopians, representatives of one of the country's poorest constituencies. ... Yair has sought dialogue. ... Some see Yair's Israeli eclecticism as an expression of ideological immaturity, of indecisiveness. In fact it reflects his ability – alone among today's leaders – to define the Israeli center. ... These voters agree with the left about the dangers of occupation and with the right about the dangers of a delusional peace.

In 2017, Lapid and his party were surging in the polls. In May 2020, following three elections, Lapid was named leader of the opposition in Israel. A month prior, Lapid had written an essay in which he described his version of centrism as "the politics of the broad consensus that empowers us all. Together, we are creating something new".

=== Italy ===
According to journalist Angelo Persichilli, Italian Christian Democratic Party leader Aldo Moro's call for a "parallel convergence" prefigured today's calls for radical centrism. Until being killed by the Red Brigades in the late 1970s, Moro had been promoting a political alliance between Christian Democracy and the Italian Communist Party. Moro acknowledged that the two parties were so different that they ran on parallel tracks and he did not want them to lose their identities, but he emphasized that in the end their interests were convergent – hence the phrase "parallel convergence", which he popularized.

In the 2010s, Spanish radical centrist Albert Rivera reportedly cited Italian politician Matteo Renzi as a soulmate.

=== Netherlands ===
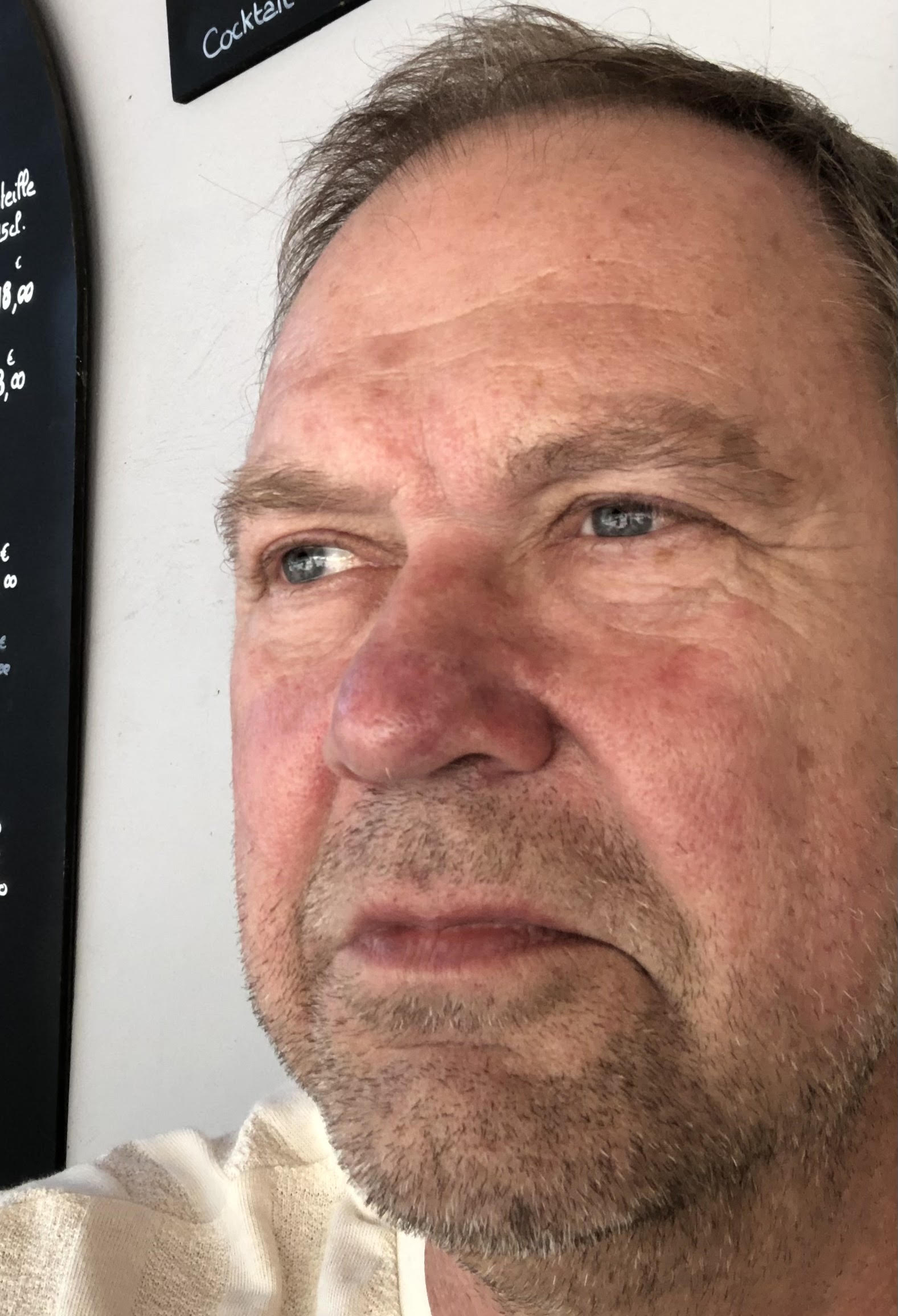
Aart Jan de Geus in 2022

According to the Dutch opinion magazine HP/De Tijd, the Dutch political party D66 can be seen as radical centrist. Radical centrism is a possibility in another Dutch party as well. In a report presented in 2012 to the Christian Democratic Appeal (CDA) party, CDA member and former minister of social affairs Aart Jan de Geus recommends that the CDA develop itself into a radical centrist ("radicale midden") party. The D66 has been seen as the more progressive and individualistic of the two parties, and the CDA as the more conservative and personalistic / communitarian.

=== New Zealand ===
The Opportunities Party (TOP), founded by economist Gareth Morgan, identifies itself as radical centrist. TOP advocates for evidence-based policy on a universal basic income, legalised cannabis, and putting a stop to the New Zealand housing crisis.

=== Russia ===
The political scientist Richard Sakwa described Putinism as radical centrism as late as 2015, noting its radicalisation with regard to the pre-2012 classical stage, when it represented "typical centrism" by eschewing extremes of left and right, and promoting a strong state that would oversee economic development in the national interest.

=== South Africa ===
South Africa's Referendum Party (RP) identifies as a radical centrist and separatist party. It was formed out of frustration at South Africa's traditional liberal-centrist Democratic Alliance (DA) perceived inability to systemically change the status-quo. RP advocates for Cape independence, Non-racialism and a Western-orientated foreign policy outlook for the Cape region of South Africa.

=== South Korea ===
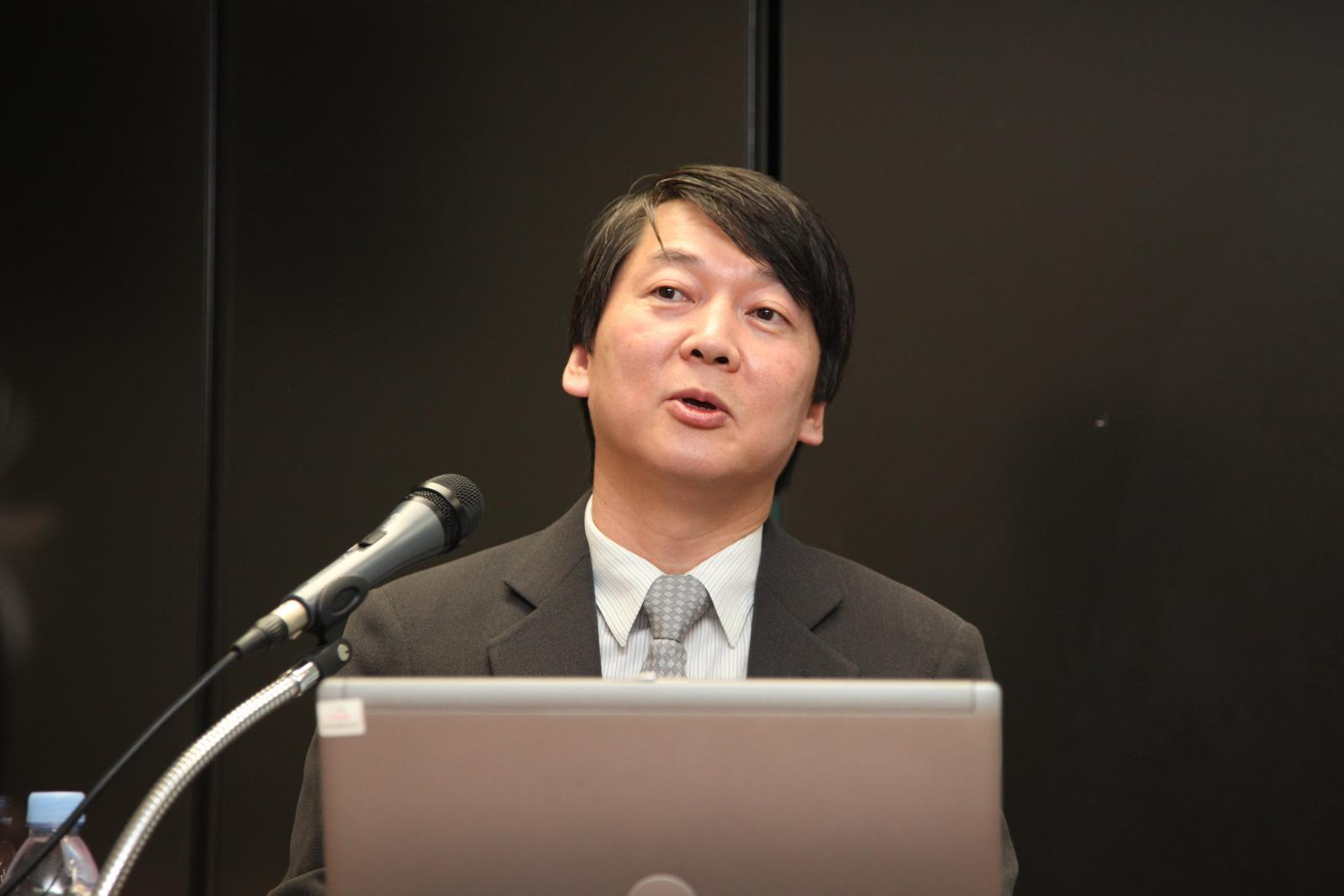
Ahn Cheol-soo speaking in 2010

In South Korea, the term Jungdogaehyeok (Korean: 중도개혁; Hanja: 中道改革; lit. 'centrist reformism') bears resemblance to the term radical centrism. The Peace Democratic Party, founded in 1987, officially put forward a jungdogaehyeok. But from then until 2016, the term was rarely used in South Korean politics.

After 2016, the People's Party, the Bareunmirae Party, the Party for Democracy and Peace, the New Alternatives party, the Minsaeng Party, and the People Party all called themselves jungdogaehyeok.

South Korean politician Ahn Cheol-soo has described himself explicitly as a "radical centrist" (Korean: 극중주의; Hanja: 極中主義; RR: geukjungjuui).

=== Spain ===
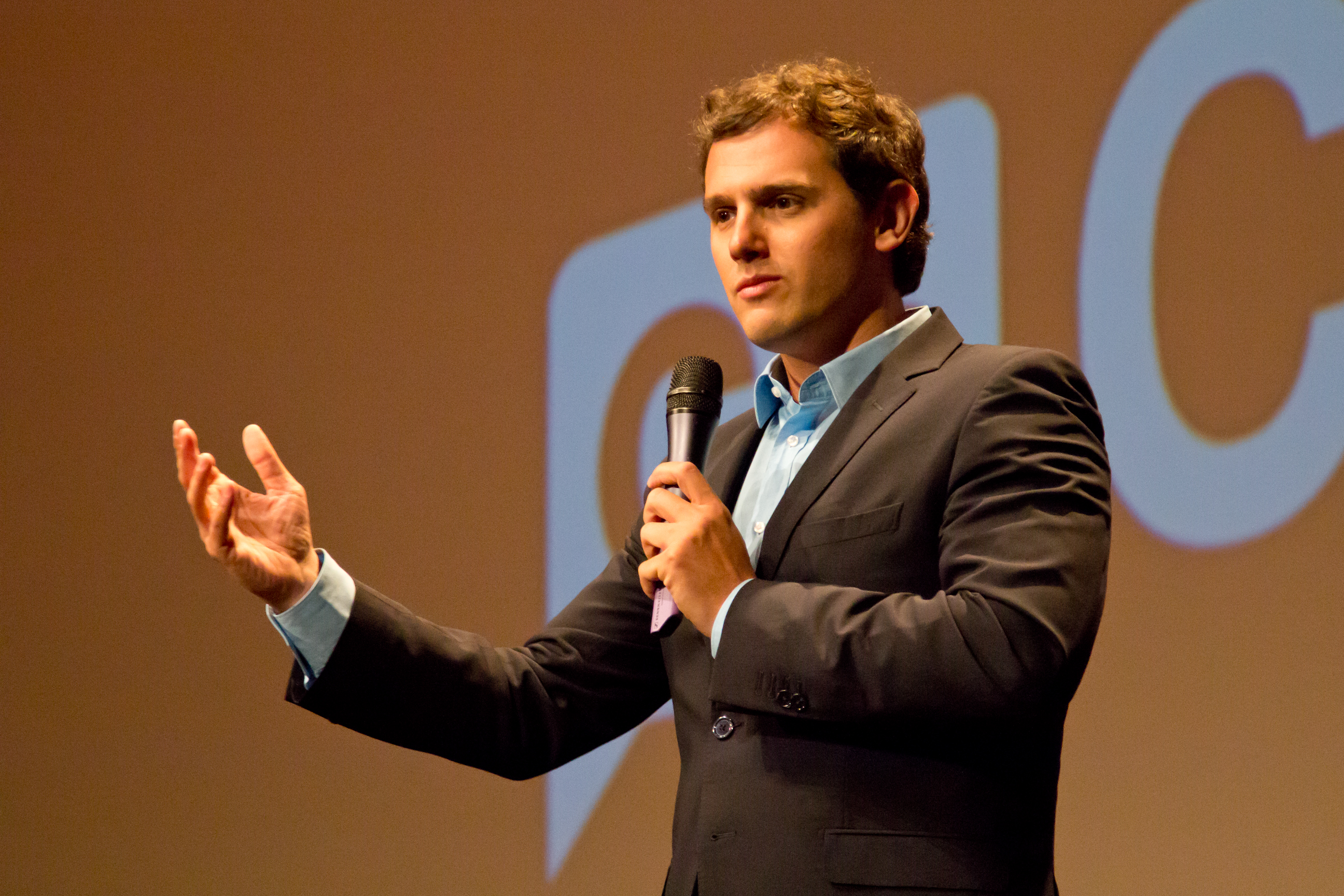
Albert Rivera speaking at a Ciudadanos event in 2015

In Spain, Albert Rivera and his Ciudadanos (Citizens) party have been described as radical centrist by Politico, as well as by Spanish-language commentators and news outlets. Rivera himself has described his movement as radical centrist, saying, "We're the radical center. We can't beat them when it comes to populism. What Ciudadanos aspires to is radical, courageous changes backed by numbers, data, proposals, economists, technicians and capable people". Rivera has called for politics to transcend the old labels, saying, "We have to move away from the old left-right axis". The Economist has likened Rivera and his party to Emmanuel Macron and his party En Marche! in France. Rivera's party has taken on the established parties of the left and right and has had some success, most notably in the 2017 Catalan regional election. In the subsequent years, though, Ciudadanos became almost irrelevant in Spanish politics, leading to Rivera's resignation as party leader.

=== United Kingdom ===
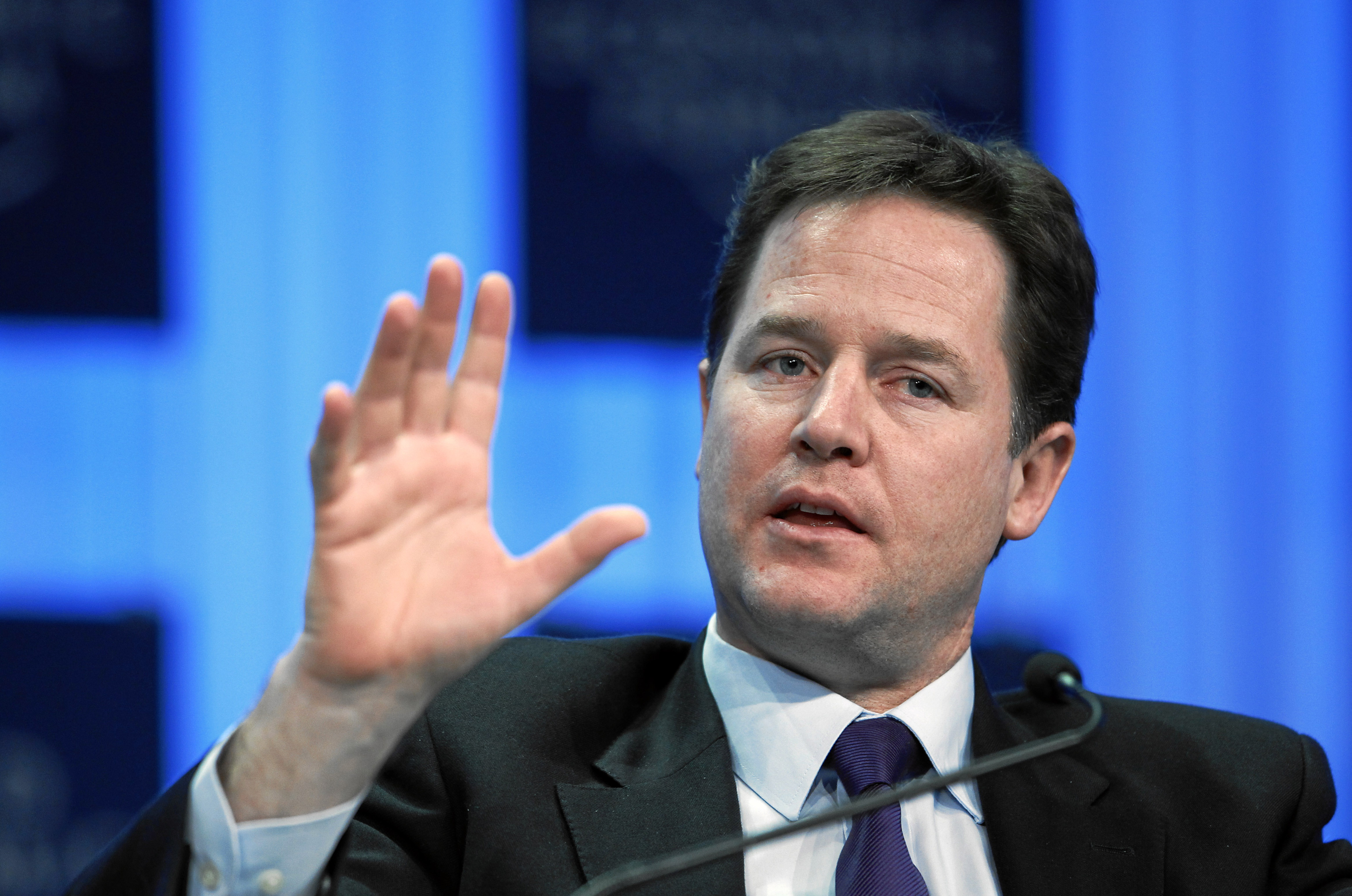
Nick Clegg speaking at the World Economic Forum annual meeting in Davos, 2011

Following the 2010 election, Nick Clegg, then leader of the Liberal Democrats (Britain's third-largest party at the time), had his party enter into a Conservative–Liberal Democrat coalition agreement to form a majority government. In a speech to party members in the spring of 2011, Clegg declared that he considers himself and his party to be radical centrist:

For the left, an obsession with the state. For the right, a worship of the market. But as liberals, we place our faith in people. People with power and opportunity in their hands. Our opponents try to divide us with their outdated labels of left and right. But we are not on the left and we are not on the right. We have our own label: Liberal. We are liberals and we own the freehold to the centre ground of British politics. Our politics is the politics of the radical centre.

In the autumn of 2012, Clegg's longtime policy advisor elaborated on the differences between Clegg's identity as a "radical liberal" and traditional social democracy. He stated that Clegg's conception of liberalism rejected "statism, paternalism, insularity and narrow egalitarianism".

In 2026, former Prime Minister Tony Blair called on the Starmer ministry to adopt radical centrism, which Blair commented would be the best method of implementing the "radical change in policy, system of government and politics" required to address the "two epochal changes happening in the world today – one geopolitical, the other technological". He further stated that radical centrism was the most viable re-election strategy because since "the centre is the place where policy comes first and politics second" and that when determining the correct analysis of the problem, "the correct answer requires radical change", therefore, "the centre should be the radical changemaker" since it "starts from the proposition that governing in the age of AI will be the principal challenge".

=== United States ===
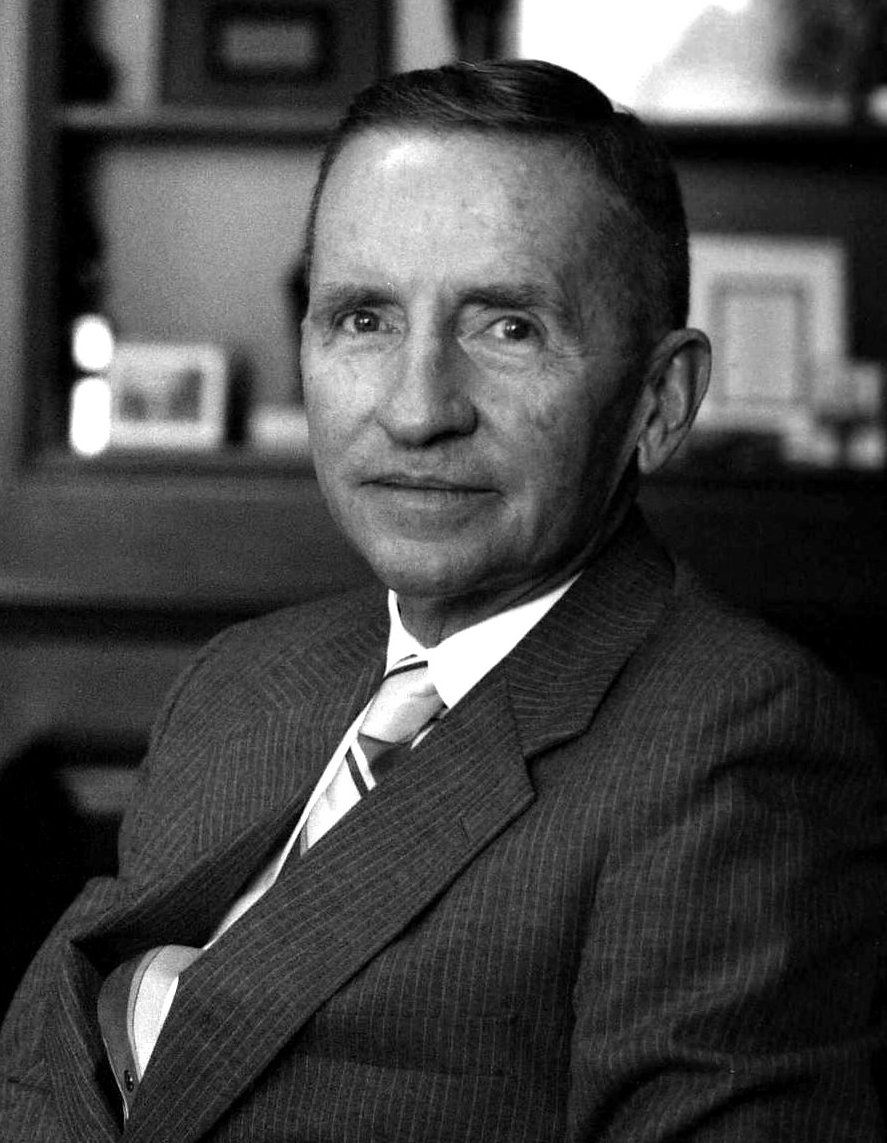
Ross Perot was an early proponent of radical centrism.

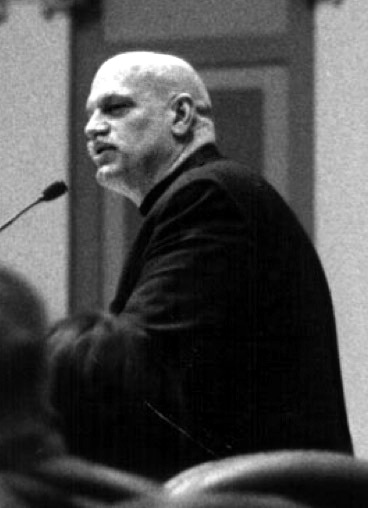
Political independent Jesse Ventura was elected Governor of Minnesota in 1998.

Some commentators identify Ross Perot's 1992 U.S. presidential campaign as the first radical centrist national campaign. However, many radical centrist authors were not enthusiastic about Perot. Matthew Miller acknowledges that Perot had enough principle to support a gasoline tax hike, Halstead and Lind note that he popularized the idea of balancing the budget and John Avlon says he crystallized popular distrust of partisan extremes. However, none of those authors examines Perot's ideas or campaigns in depth and Mark Satin does not mention Perot at all. Joe Klein mocked one of Perot's campaign gaffes and said he was not a sufficiently substantial figure. Miller characterizes Perot as a rich, self-financed lone wolf. By contrast, what most radical centrists say they want in political action terms is the building of a grounded political movement.

Also in the 1990s, political independents Jesse Ventura, Angus King and Lowell Weicker became governors of American states. According to John Avlon, they pioneered the combination of fiscal prudence and social tolerance that has served as a model for radical centrist governance ever since. They also developed a characteristic style, a combination of "common sense and maverick appeal". (Note: By the end of the 20th century, some mainstream politicians were cloaking themselves in the language of the radical center. For example, in 1996 former U.S. Defense Secretary Elliot Richardson stated: "I am a moderate – a radical moderate. I believe profoundly in the ultimate value of human dignity and equality". At a conference in Berlin, Canadian Prime Minister Jean Chrétien declared, "I am the radical center".)

In the decade of the 2000s, a number of governors and mayors – most prominently, California governor Arnold Schwarzenegger and New York City mayor Michael Bloomberg – were celebrated by Time magazine as "action heroes" who looked beyond partisanship to get things done. A similar article that decade in Politico placed "self-styled 'radical centrist'" governor Mark Warner of Virginia in that camp.

In the 2010s, the radical centrist movement in the U.S. played out in the national media. In 2010, for example, The New York Times columnist Thomas Friedman called for "a Tea Party of the radical center", an organized national pressure group. Friedman later co-wrote a book with scholar Michael Mandelbaum discussing key issues in American society and calling for an explicitly radical centrist politics and program to deal with them. At The Washington Post, columnist Matthew Miller was explaining "Why we need a third party of (radical) centrists". (Note: In 2009, on The Huffington Post website, the president of The Future 500 – following up on his earlier endorsement of the "radical middle" – made the case for a "transpartisan" alliance between left and right.)

In 2011, Friedman championed Americans Elect, an insurgent group of radical centrist Democrats, Republicans and independents who were hoping to run an independent presidential candidate in 2012. Meanwhile, Miller offered "[t]he third-party stump speech we need". In his book The Price of Civilization (2011), Columbia University economist Jeffrey Sachs called for the creation of a third U.S. party, an "Alliance for the Radical Center".

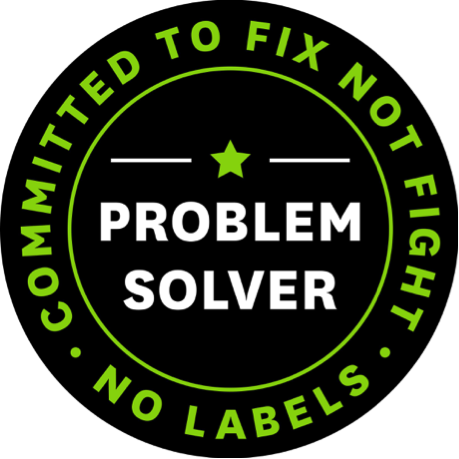
Insignia of the No Labels organization

While no independent radical-centrist presidential candidate emerged in 2012, John Avlon emphasized the fact that independent voters remain the fastest-growing portion of the electorate.

In late 2015, the No Labels organization, co-founded by Avlon, called a national "Problem Solver" convention to discuss how to best reduce political polarization and promote political solutions that could bridge the left-right divide. A lengthy article in The Atlantic about the convention conveys the views of leaders of a new generation of beyond-left-and-right (or both-left-and-right) organizations, including Joan Blades of Living Room Conversations, David Blankenhorn of Better Angels, Carolyn Lukensmeyer of the National Institute for Civil Discourse and Steve McIntosh of the Institute for Cultural Evolution. Following the 2016 presidential election, prominent U.S. commentator David Brooks praised No Labels and other such groups and offered them advice, including this: "[D]eepen a positive national vision that is not merely a positioning between left and right".

By the mid-2010s, several exponents of radical centrism had run, albeit unsuccessfully, for seats in the United States Congress, including Matthew Miller in California and Dave Anderson in Maryland.

According to a January 2018 article in The Washington Post, West Virginia Senator Joe Manchin greeted newly elected Alabama Senator Doug Jones with the phrase, "Welcome to the radical middle". Both senators have been regarded as moderate and bipartisan. In March 2018, the political newspaper The Hill ran an article by attorney Michael D. Fricklas entitled "The Time for Radical Centrism Has Come". It asserted that the omnibus spending bill for 2018 jettisoned spending proposals favored by both political "extremes" to obtain votes of "principled moderates", and that its passage therefore represented a victory for what Senator Susan Collins (R-Maine) calls "radical centrism".

Toward the beginning of the 2020 Democratic Party presidential primaries, Steven Teles of the Niskanen Center, writing in The New Republic, laid out a strategy by which a dark horse candidate appealing to the radical center could win the Democratic Party presidential nomination.

The Forward Party, a political action committee created by former presidential candidate Andrew Yang in October 2021, was critically described as a radical centrist movement by the American socialist magazine, Jacobin. Two days after the creation of the Forward Party, Yang tweeted, "You're giving radical centrists like me a home."

== Criticism ==
Even before the 21st century, some observers were criticizing what they saw as radical centrism. In the 1960s, liberal political cartoonist Jules Feiffer employed the term "radical middle" to mock what he saw as the timid and pretentious outlook of the American political class. (Note: According to journalist John Judis, sociologist Seymour Martin Lipset used the term "radical centrism" in his book Political Man (1960) to help explain European fascism.) During the Ross Perot presidential campaign of 1992, conservative journalist William Safire suggested that a more appropriate term for the radical center might be the "snarling center". In a 1998 article entitled "The Radical Centre: A Politics Without Adversary", Belgian political theorist Chantal Mouffe argued that passionate and often bitter conflict between left and right is a necessary feature of any democracy. (Note: Mouffe also criticized radical centrism for its "New Age rhetorical flourish".)

=== Objections to policies, assumptions and attitudes ===
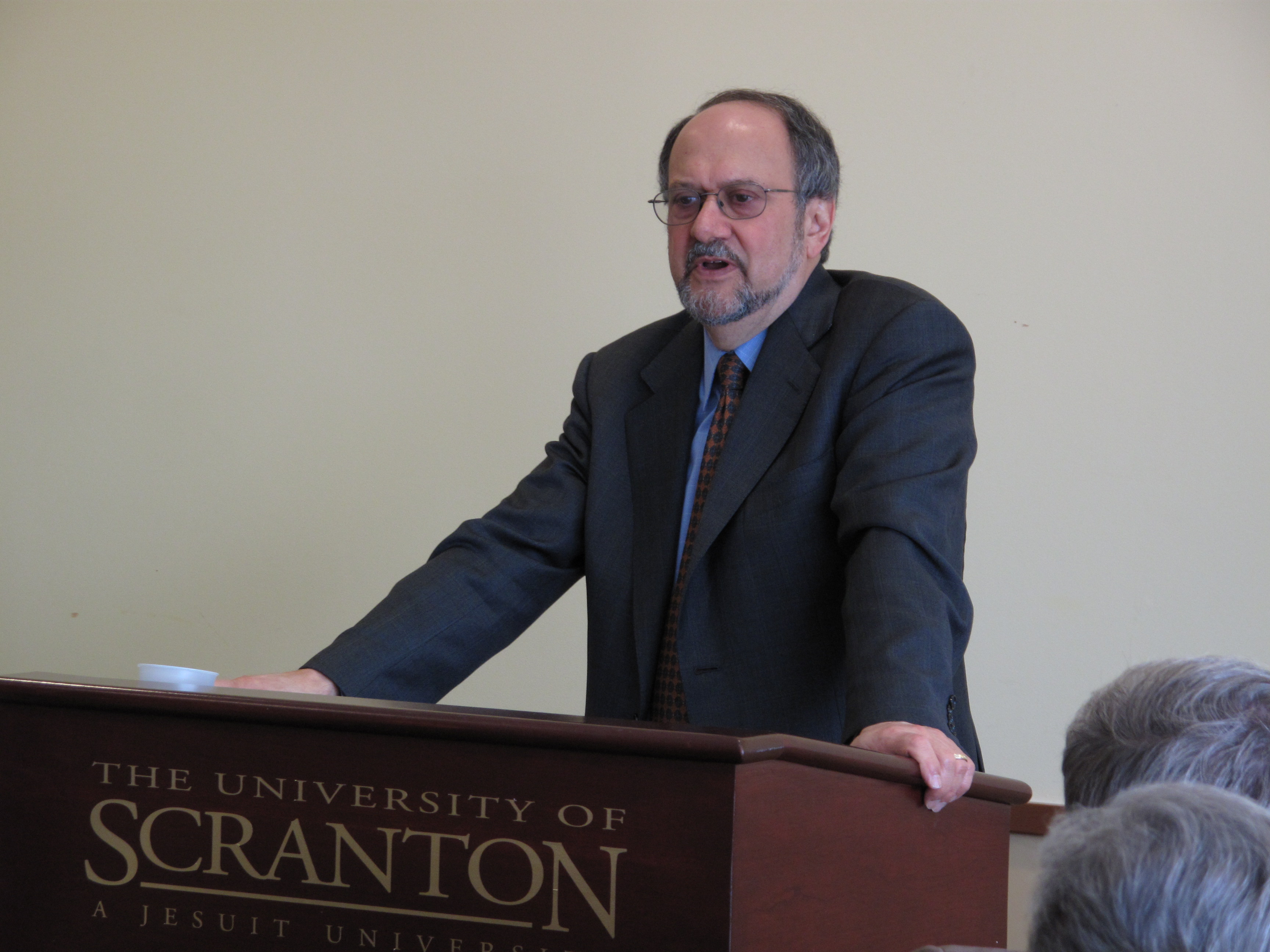
Liberal journalist Robert Kuttner, a notable critic of radical centrism

Some 21st-century commentators argue that radical centrist policies are not substantially different from conventional centrist ideas. For example, US liberal journalist Robert Kuttner says there already is a radical centrist party – "It's called the Democrats". He faults Matthew Miller's version of radical centrism for offering "feeble" policy solutions and indulging in wishful thinking about the motives of the political right. Progressive social theorist Richard Kahlenberg says that Ted Halstead and Michael Lind's book The Radical Center is too skeptical about the virtues of labor unions and too ardent about the virtues of the market.

Others contend that radical centrist policies lack clarity. For example, in 2001 journalist Eric Alterman said that the New America Foundation think tank was neither liberal nor progressive and did not know what it was.

Politico reports that some think Spain's radical centrist Ciudadanos (Citizens) party is "encouraged by the Spanish establishment" to undercut the radical left and preserve the status quo.

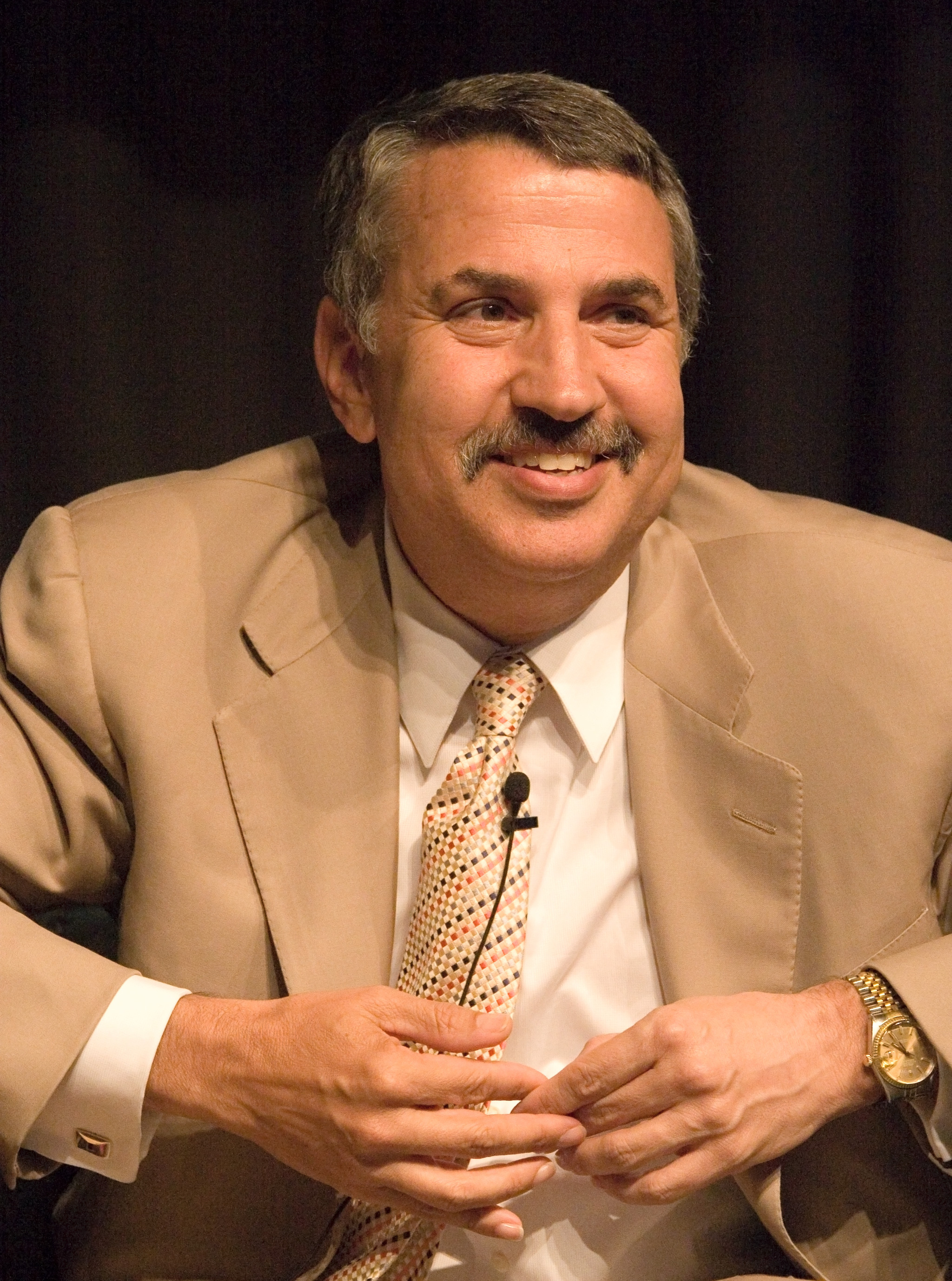
Thomas Friedman's columns supporting radical centrism are a favorite target for bloggers.

By contrast, some observers claim that radical centrist ideas are too different from mainstream policies to be viable. Sam Tanenhaus, the editor of The New York Times Book Review, called the proposals in Halstead and Lind's book "utopian". According to Ed Kilgore, the policy director of the Democratic Leadership Council, Mark Satin's Radical Middle book "ultimately places him in the sturdy tradition of 'idealistic' American reformers who think smart and principled people unencumbered by political constraints can change everything".

Some have suggested that radical centrists may be making false assumptions about their effectiveness or appeal. In the United States, for example, political analyst James Joyner found that states adopting non-partisan redistricting commissions, a favorite radical-centrist proposal, have been no more fiscally responsible than states without such commissions. In 2017, The Economist wondered whether Latin Americans really wanted to hear the "hard truths" about their societies that some radical centrists were offering them.

Radical centrist attitudes have also been criticized. For example, many bloggers have characterized Thomas Friedman's columns on radical centrism as elitist and glib. In Australia, some think that Australian attorney Noel Pearson – long an advocate of radical centrism – is in fact a "polarizing partisan". In 2012, conservative Knesset member Tzipi Hotovely criticized Israel's radical center for lacking such attributes as courage, decisiveness, and realistic thinking.

=== Objections to strategies ===
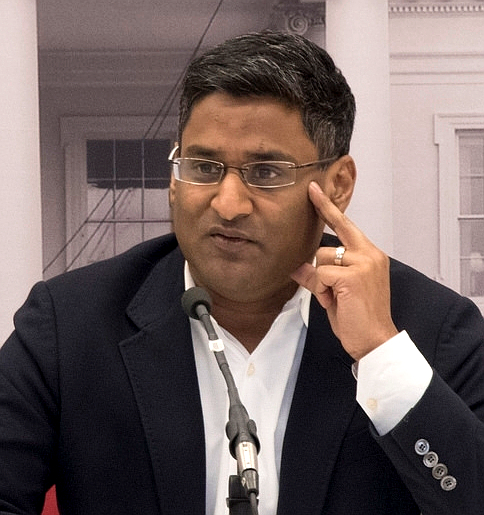
Conservative journalist Ramesh Ponnuru, who has criticized radical centrist strategy

Some observers question the wisdom of seeking consensus, post-partisanship or reconciliation in political life. Political scientist Jonathan Bernstein argues that American democratic theory from the time of James Madison's Federalist No. 10 (1787) has been based on the acknowledgement of faction and the airing of debate, and he sees no reason to change now.

Other observers feel radical centrists are misreading the political situation. For example, conservative journalist Ramesh Ponnuru says liberals and conservatives are not ideologically opposed to such radical centrist measures as limiting entitlements and raising taxes to cover national expenditures. Instead, voters are opposed to them and things will change when voters can be convinced otherwise.

The third-party strategy favored by many U.S. radical centrists has been criticized as impractical and diversionary. According to these critics, what is needed instead is (a) reform of the legislative process; and (b) candidates in existing political parties who will support radical centrist ideas. The specific third-party vehicle favored by many U.S. radical centrists in 2012 – Americans Elect – was criticized as an "elite-driven party" supported by a "dubious group of Wall Street multi-millionaires".

After spending time with a variety of radical centrists, Alec MacGillis of The New Republic concluded that their perspectives are so disparate that they could never come together to build a viable political organization.

=== Internal concerns ===
Some radical centrists are less than sanguine about their future. One concern is co-optation. For example, Michael Lind worries that the enthusiasm for the term radical center, on the part of "arbiters of the conventional wisdom", may signal a weakening of the radical vision implied by the term.

Another concern is passion. John Avlon fears that some centrists cannot resist the lure of passionate partisans, whom he calls "wingnuts". By contrast, Mark Satin worries that radical centrism, while "thoroughly sensible", lacks an "animating passion" – and claims there has never been a successful political movement without one.

== As dialogue and process ==
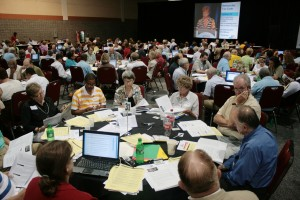
2011 AmericaSpeaks event

Some radical centrists, such as theorist Tom Atlee, mediator Mark Gerzon, and activist Joseph F. McCormick, see radical centrism as primarily a commitment to process. Their approach is to facilitate processes of structured dialogue among polarized people and groups, from the neighborhood level on up. A major goal is to enable dialogue participants to come up with new perspectives and solutions that can address every party's core interests. Onward Christian Athletes author Tom Krattenmaker speaks of the radical center as that (metaphoric) space where such dialogue and innovation can occur. Similarly, The Lipstick Proviso: Women, Sex, and Power in the Real World author Karen Lehrman Bloch speaks of the radical middle as a "common ground" where left and right can "nurture a saner society".

Organizations seeking to catalyze dialogue and innovation among diverse people and groups have included AmericaSpeaks, C1 World Dialogue, Everyday Democracy, Listening Project (North Carolina), Living Room Conversations, Public Conversations Project, Search for Common Ground, and Village Square. Organizations specifically for university students include BridgeUSA and Sustained Dialogue. The city of Portland, Oregon has been characterized as "radical middle" in USA Today newspaper because many formerly antagonistic groups there are said to be talking to, learning from and working with one another.

In 2005, The Atlantic portrayed Egyptian Islamic cleric Ali Gomaa as the voice of an emergent form of radical Islam – "traditionalism without the extremism". In 2012, in an article entitled "The Radical Middle: Building Bridges Between the Muslim and Western Worlds, Gomaa shared his approach to the dialogic process:

The purpose of dialogue should not be to convert others, but rather to share with them one's principles. Sincere dialogue should strengthen one's faith while breaking down barriers. ... Dialogue is a process of exploration and coming to know the other, as much as it is an example of clarifying one's own positions. Therefore, when one dialogues with others, what is desired is to explore their ways of thinking, so as to correct misconceptions in our own minds and arrive at common ground.

In 2017, former American football player and Green Beret soldier Nate Boyer suggested that his "radical middle" stance could help address the issues and resolve the controversy surrounding U.S. national anthem protests at football games.

== See also ==
- Centrist populism – Political ideology
- Centrist reformism – South Korean political ideology
- Political syncretism – Combining elements from across the left–right spectrum
