= Beyond left and right =

The term "beyond left and right" refers to any political position, ideology, party or movement that refuses to be classified on the conventional left–right political spectrum. It may also refer to:

- Beyond Left and Right: The Future of Radical Politics, a 1994 book by Anthony Giddens
- Centrism
- Distributism
- Radical centrism
- Third Position
- Third Way
- Fourth Political Theory
- National Bolshevism
