= Transpartisan =

School of political thought

Transpartisan, or transpartisanship, represents an emerging paradigm of political thought which accepts the validity of truths across a range of political perspectives and seeks to synthesize them into an inclusive, pragmatic container beyond typical political dualities. It is distinct from bipartisanship, which aims to negotiate between "right" and "left", resulting in a dualistic perspective, and nonpartisanship, which tends to avoid political affiliation altogether.

== Philosophy ==
Transpartisanship is a movement to support and advance a common ground—or "new center"—that already existed in U.S. politics, emerging periodically into public view in the form of "unusual coalitions" of progressives and conservatives around issues ranging from war and the military budget to corporate power and the surveillance state.

The movement builds on methods of facilitated dialogue, deliberation and conflict resolution.

Current examples of transpartisan initiatives include Transpartisan Center, TheSolution.org, Reuniting America, Transpartisan Alliance, and Liberty Coalition.

Transpartisanship is an emerging field that advocates pragmatic and effective solutions to social and political problems, transcending and including preexisting political ideologies. Transpartisanship encompasses the idea that all systems are inextricably interconnected, and that successful outcomes can best be reached through inclusive, genuine, and respectful cooperation. Transpartisan democracy, in part, seeks to reintegrate the public's voice in identifying, debating, and shaping governmental policies, while continuing to protect the sovereignty of the individual.

The term "transpartisanship" has emerged to provide a meaningful alternative to "bipartisanship" and "nonpartisanship". Bipartisanship limits the dialogue process to two political viewpoints or entities, striving for compromise solutions. Nonpartisanship, on the other hand, tends to deny the existence of differing viewpoints in exchange for cooperation. Both the bipartisan and nonpartisan approaches can discount the multiplicity of viewpoints that exist, which often results in incomplete and therefore unsuccessful outcomes. In contrast to these, transpartisanship recognizes the existence and validity of many points of view, and advocates a constructive dialogue aimed at arriving at creative, integrated, and therefore, breakthrough solutions that meet the needs of all present.

Transpartisan gatherings have resulted not only in surprisingly civil conversations noted by mainstream media but also in shifts from traditional ideological stances by some participants.

A close relative of transpartisanship is integral politics. A transpartisan approach to policy would necessarily include individual and collective, as well as subjective and objective, perspective. Furthermore, similar to integral theory, transpartisanship places politics in a developmental context, viewing democracy and prosperity not as static attainments, but rather emergent properties along a continuum of adult development.

== Transpartisan political parties ==
=== En Marche! ===
In 2016, Emmanuel Macron created a new French political party, En Marche. The party sought to transcend traditional political boundaries to be a transpartisan organisation.

Macron has described the party as being a progressive party uniting the left and the right. Observers and political commentators have described the party as being both socially and economically liberal in ideology, Emmanuel Macron became the President of France. The party also won the National Assembly elections a month later, as candidates in the legislative elections included members of the Democratic Movement, as well as dissidents from the Socialist Party, The Republicans and minor parties. It won an absolute majority of seats in the National Assembly, securing 308 under its label and 42 for the MoDem.

=== Binaa Sudan Party ===
Binaa Sudan Party was established in February 2018 following an invitation from the Sudanese Shadow Government, a group of youth professionals who joined to form a non-ideological organisation to produce a practical manifesto to put solutions for Sudan's state problems. Binaa Sudan Party (BSP) labels itself as a Transpartisan organization. BSP is the first Transpartisan political party in Africa and the MENA region and claims that the Sudanese Shadow Government, established 2013, is the first transpartisan organization that played an active rule in a political map.

== See also ==
- New World Alliance
- Postpartisan
- Radical centrism
