= Binaa Sudan Party =

Political party in Sudan

Binaa Sudan Party حزب بناء السودان Hizb Binaa Al Sudan
- Founder: Sudanese Shadow Government, Wael Omer Abdin, Ahmed Eltayeb Moh, Hani Abuelgasim, Asim Khidir, Omer Seddig, Mazin Saad, Shahd Eltai, Mujahid Khalfallah, M El-Jazouli
- Founded: 2018
- Headquarters: Khartoum
- Ideology: None; Transpartisanship
- Political position: Centre
- National affiliation: Sudanese Professionals Association
- National Assembly: 0 / 426

Website
- Official website

Binaa Sudan Party (Arabic: حزب بناء السودان, romanized: Hizb Binaa Al Sudan), abbreviated BSP, is a political party in Sudan. Established February 2018 following an invitation from the Sudanese Shadow Government, a group of youth professionals who joined together to form a non-ideological organisation to produce a practical manifesto to put solutions for Sudan's state problems. Binaa Sudan Party is a Transpartisan organization. BSP has signed the Deceleration of Freedom and Change, which is an alliance that initiated and led the topple of Omar Al-Bashir in 2019.

== History ==
The Sudanese Shadow Government is a political organization which announced its establishment on 24 December 2013 in Khartoum, Sudan. After 5 years of attempting to reform the political environment in Sudan, it called for establishing a new political party to lead the change in political agenda, aiming to stop the ideology based conflict to shift the political competition towards addressing citizens' problems and concerns.

== Ideology ==
Binaa Sudan Party seeks to transcend traditional political boundaries to be a Transpartisan organization.

== Electoral history ==
There has been no elections in Sudan since the establishment of the party.
