= Health court =

Specialized court for medical malpractice claims

Health courts are proposed specialized courts for handling medical malpractice claims. They are characterized by the use of specially trained adjudicators, independent expert witnesses, and predictable damage awards. Successful administrative compensation systems currently exist in New Zealand and Scandinavia, and limited programs also operate in Florida and Virginia. The nonpartisan coalition Common Good, led by Philip K. Howard, and the Harvard School of Public Health have advocated implementing health courts on a wider scale in the U.S. The potential advantages of health courts include decreasing administrative costs, improving access to compensation for injured patients, and disincentivizing defensive medicine. By using trained judges and independent experts, health court advocates hope to achieve more fair outcomes at lower costs. Critics of the health courts concept contend that is ill-conceived, that it would be unfair to patients, that it would be unlikely to achieve its objectives, and that such of its goals as are reasonable can be achieved more fairly and with greater efficiency under the existing civil justice system. In addition, experts have suggested that health courts would be inevitably biased towards physicians, and that the bureaucracy needed to introduce safeguards against such bias would negate any cost savings.

In February 2011, President Barack Obama's administration announced a $250 million fund in the fiscal year 2012 budget for medical malpractice reforms, with special emphasis on health courts.
