= CaliforniaSpeaks =

2007 US forum on health care reform

CaliforniaSpeaks was a statewide nonpartisan deliberative forum on health care reform that took place on August 11, 2007. More than 2,000 Californians gathered in "town meetings" at eight locations, including Eureka, Fresno, Los Angeles, Oakland, Riverside, Sacramento, San Diego, and San Luis Obispo. It was organized by the nonprofit AmericaSpeaks, and was funded by The California Endowment, The California Wellness Foundation, and the Blue Shield of California Foundation. In 2007, it was described as "one of the world's biggest ever public engagement processes" by a UK public participation charity. A 2015 article in the journal Political Communication has described it as a "natural experiment" in structured deliberation.

Organizers of the CaliforniaSpeaks worked with a survey research firm to randomly select demographically diverse participants who would be representative of their localities. During the event, participants were assigned to groups of 8 to 10 people with whom they discussed health care issues throughout the day, with the help of a skilled facilitator. Each participant reported their views through a keypad device, and filled out surveys before and after the session. The results of the forum were compiled into a report, which was then presented to the California legislature and governor, and subsequently influenced proposed legislation.

== Background ==
On January 9, 2007, Republican Governor Arnold Schwarzenegger of California proposed comprehensive health insurance reform for California that would lead to nearly universal health insurance coverage in the state. The $12-billion plan sought to provide medical insurance to the 5.6 million adults and quarter of a million children who did not have it. Both supporters and opponents of the plan acknowledged its audaciousness; Schwarzenegger sought to impose "new fees and obligations on doctors, hospitals, employers and insurers" to pay for it. Although the governor's plan won international praise, it failed to win support from the healthcare industry or from the business lobby.

By mid-year, Democrats in the Assembly and Senate combined two measures which sought to reduce the number of Californians without insurance into a new bill which would have required California employers to spend 7.5% of payroll on health insurance for their workers. At the time, Democrats were confident that they would be able to persuade the governor to sign some form of the bill into law.

== The forum ==
=== Selection process ===
Initially, 120,000 people were solicited to join the CaliforniaSpeaks event on August 11, 2007. In the end, there were a total of 3,500 participants in CaliforniaSpeaks, but only 60% of them were from the random selection process. The other 40% included people who were recruited by interest groups or grassroots organizations (19%), plus friends and family who came along. There were more than 440 professionals who volunteered as table facilitators on the day.

=== Town halls in eight cities ===
On the day, Governor Schwarzenegger addressed participants in Los Angeles in person, and other locations by satellite video link. The event was broadcast live on public television and via webcast.

Also participating in the event were Assembly Speaker Fabian Nuñez and Senate President Pro Tem Don Perata, both Democrats, as well as the Republican Assembly Leader Michael Villines. During the opening session, the governor and legislators pledged to accept the recommendations made by CaliforniaSpeaks and to take action on legislation.

Participants were presented with six proposed changes to healthcare. In small groups of 8 to 10 people, they discussed what they liked, their concerns, additional aspects that were not addressed, and what changes they would support. At the end of the event, AmericaSpeaks handed out postcards pre-addressed to participants' lawmakers.

=== Participant reactions ===
According to AmericaSpeaks, participants in CaliforniaSpeaks left feeling more positive about state government. They also expressed a stronger belief in their own ability to be heard, and were more likely to take political action, compared to non-attendees.

Some participants questioned how the forum could have truly been neutral, if it was funded in part by foundations established by insurers. Others complained that rather than encouraging a free-ranging discussion, the choices participants were offered were restricted to those that the Schwarzenegger administration had identified as "feasible for legislative passage". Critics also expressed regret that AmericaSpeaks had not taken specific feedback onboard.

== The results ==
Participants identified four key values to guide health care reform at the start of the forum: Health care should be affordable by all, everyone should have access, greed (profit) should not be part of the system, and wellness/prevention should be a priority. There was general support for the AB8/Governor’s range of proposals, with a number of conditions. Employer mandates were supported but most participants also wanted to assure that part-time and other employees were covered. Individual mandates were supported as long as there was an adequate standard for quality of care and other guarantees.

Over 80% of this cross-section of Californians expressed a willingness to “share the responsibility” for paying for expanded health insurance.

Results from the discussion were compiled into a report at the end of the meeting, and were given to participants, decision-makers and the media as the meeting concluded.

== The impact ==
The results and interpretation were presented to representatives of the California Legislature and Governor on August 23, 2007.

The conclusions drawn during CaliforniaSpeaks directly influenced legislators' approach to the compromise bill which followed. The compromise bill moved closer to reflect participants' views on three-quarters of the issues that had been debated, such as the importance of prevention and wellness, and streamlining administrative procedures, as approaches to cost containment. 58% of participants had supported a cap on insurer profits, which had only been part of the governor's original proposal; this, too, was added to the final compromise bill.

== See also ==
- AmericaSpeaks
- Medicare for All Act
- Universal health care
