= Chickering =

Chickering may refer to:

- Chickering, Suffolk, a place in Suffolk, England
- Chickering & Sons, the piano company that was created by Jonas Chickering
- Arthur M. Chickering, an arachnologist
- Arthur W. Chickering, a researcher of student development theories
- Charles R. Chickering, an American illustrator and stamp designer
- Elmer Chickering, an American photographer
- Jonas Chickering, an American piano manufacturer
- Lawrence Chickering, Hoover Institute public policy analyst, Lawyer
- Roger Chickering, historian
