= Beyond Left and Right =

Beyond Left and Right: The Future of Radical Politics
- Cover of the 1994 Stanford University Press edition
- Author: Anthony Giddens
- Published: January 1994
- Publisher: Stanford University Press
- Pages: 284
- ISBN: 9780804724517

Beyond Left and Right: The Future of Radical Politics is a book by British sociologist Anthony Giddens, edited in 1994. Ths book examines the changing conditions of political life under modernity and globalization, arguing that the traditional categories of left and right are no longer sufficient for understanding contemporary radical politics. Giddens reassesses socialism, conservatism, and neoliberalism while seeking a political framework capable of responding to new forms of social change, uncertainty, and risk. The book develops ideas that became important to Giddens's later political thought, particularly concerning social democracy, welfare, democracy, and the relationship between individual agency and social transformation..

== Contents ==
The book begins by examining globalization, tradition, uncertainty, and the changing relationship between socialism, conservatism, and neoliberalism. It then discusses conservatism and the retreat of socialism from radical politics, followed by an analysis of the social revolutions associated with reflexive modernization. Later chapters address democratization, contradictions within the welfare state, generative politics and positive welfare, poverty and life values, ecological issues and life politics, political theory and violence, and finally questions of agency and values. Across these topics, Giddens develops his argument for a form of radical politics that moves beyond the conventional left–right division. Giddens argues that the left has become defensive while the right has become radical, and proposes “philosophic conservatism” as a basis for radical politics. He also places the ecological crisis, the end of tradition, and globalization at the centre of this rethinking, alongside fundamentalism, gender divisions, and political violence.

== See also ==
- Left–right politics
- Centrism
- Distributism
- Radical centrism
- Third Position
- Third Way
- Fourth Political Theory
- National Bolshevism
