= Carolyn Lukensmeyer =

American activist and public servant

Carolyn J. Lukensmeyer is an American activist who is a leader in the field of deliberative democracy, a public servant and social entrepreneur. She is Executive Director Emerita of The National Institute for Civil Discourse. In 1995, she founded AmericaSpeaks, a non-partisan non-profit organization that strengthens citizen voice in decision making. Carolyn was chief of staff to Governor Celeste of Ohio from 1986 to 1991. She was Consultant to the White House Chief of Staff for nine months during Bill Clinton's first term.

== Early life ==
Lukensmeyer was born on May 13, 1945, in Hampton, Iowa. Lukensmeyer grew up in a four generation family and they instilled in her a strong sense of values, including: a strong ethos of fairness and justice, outrage over injustice, and a belief in standing up for the underdog. From a very young age, Lukensmeyer was interested in learning how systems work. She wanted to know who makes the decisions, who holds the power, and how to keep expanding it.

== Career ==
=== AmericaSpeaks ===
Lukensmeyer was the President and Founder of AmericaSpeaks from 1995–2012, a national non-profit whose mission was to link citizen voice with the governance of the nation, and to influence leaders in the nation's capital. After the election of 1994—which was known as the “angry white men” election year—Lukensmeyer was disappointed that women didn’t turn out in the same numbers that they did in 1992. Because only 13,000 total votes changed the majority in Congress in 1994, Lukensmeyer realized that the failure of the system was not because of partisan issues. The system failed because of engagement issues. Lukensmeyer was inspired to organize AmericaSpeaks. AmericaSpeaks works to identify and create new governance mechanisms, and to design citizen engagement processes that combine face-to-face deliberation and electronic technology in order to support democracy. AmericaSpeaks projects have engaged over 200,000 people in over 50 21st Century Town Hall Meetings in all 50 states and the District of Columbia. AmericaSpeaks brings citizens together to deliberate about critical policy issues. The conclusions from these meetings are then brought to decision-makers so that citizen input can directly influence policy.

=== Neighborhood Action ===
From December 1999 to July 2000, Lukensmeyer served as the interim Executive Director of Washington DC Mayor Anthony Williams' initiative to engage residents in the public policy process. Lukensmeyer coordinated a strategic planning process with an expansive citizen engagement initiative. Neighborhood Action culminated in an all-day Citizen Summit in November 1999. Three thousand citizens developed shared priorities for the District and their conclusions were directly reflected in the city's Fiscal Year 2001 budget and strategic plan. Neighborhood Action received the project of the year award from the International Association for Public Participation and also a Best Practice Award by the Department of Housing and Urban Development.

=== Chief of Staff to Governor Celeste ===
From December 1986 to January 1991, Lukensmeyer served as Chief of Staff to Governor Richard F. Celeste of Ohio. She was both the first woman to serve in this capacity and, at the time of her appointment, the only Chief of Staff recruited from the professional management field. While serving, Lukensmeyer managed the operations of twenty eight state agencies and over 200 boards and commissions that comprised 55,000 employees and a $23 billion annual budget. Lukensmeyer spearheaded the modernization of the state of Ohio's bureaucracy, which included measures such as: creative approaches to systems design, professional development, human resource and crisis management, and innovative problem solving and communication. She also created the cluster system for cross-agency budget development and seamless delivery systems. Additionally, Lukensmeyer developed performance contracts between Cabinet Officers and the Governor. These contracts were the first of their kind in the United States.

=== White House Days: 1993–1994 ===
Lukensmeyer served as Consultant to the White House Chief of Staff from November 1993 through June 1994. She ensured that systematic thinking was part of the White House's work on internal management issues and she was also heavily involved in government-wide reform. Lukensmeyer directed the management audit that evaluated the decision-making processes and structures of the White House. After the audit was complete, Lukensmeyer made recommendations for staff changes and redesigning the system between working units. Additionally, Lukensmeyer restructured the Office of the Chief of Staff. Lukensmeyer designed the National Service Corporation, which merged four previously existing agencies, and she facilitated the implementation of the Corporation. Also, Lukensmeyer designed, developed the strategy of, and facilitated the startup of the Council of Chief Financial Officers of the Federal Government. Additionally, Lukensmeyer designed and facilitated several two-day working sessions for the President, Vice President, Cabinet, and key White House staff.

==== National Performance Review ====
In March 1993, Vice President Gore appointed Lukensmeyer as the Deputy Director for Management of the National Performance Review. The National Performance Review (NPR), was Vice President Al Gore's reinventing government task force. Lukensmeyer ensured that the Review was on time and under budget and that NPR staff and external stakeholders understood the mission and methods of the NPR. In addition to contributing to the NPR's analysis of training, performance agreements, and community empowerment, Lukensmeyer designed the work processes for cross-cutting teams including information technology, budgeting, and partnerships between state and local governments. Lukensmeyer created committees such as the President's Management Council and the Labor-Management Partnership Council. Lukensmeyer also designed an outreach strategy to involve senior-level federal employees in the reform effort.

=== Lukensmeyer Associates, Inc. ===
Lukensmeyer is President of Lukensmeyer Associates, Inc., an organization consulting firm founded in 1974. She established an international reputation in the field of Organizational Development and Management Consulting. Clients range in size from 10 to more than 350,000 employees, representing public and private sectors from five continents. Her consulting projects have centered around areas such as creating partnerships between public and private organizations, education reform, the transformation and revitalization of bureaucratic systems, and planning processes to integrate corporate strategy, structures, and human resources. Lukensmeyer Associates has also developed programs to move women into top management positions. Lukensmeyer has directed several major projects through Lukensmeyer Associates. For example, Lukensmeyer led the team that designed and facilitated the Cleveland Education Summit which was a community-wide effort representing ten stakeholder groups including parents, teachers, students, administrators, elected officials, and corporations. More than 2,000 citizens were involved in the project over its two-year span. At the conclusion of the Summit, Lukensmeyer Associates had produced a strategic plan for Cleveland's Public School Districts. Lukensmeyer Associates also designed and implemented self-managing work teams in the research and development departments of the Polaroid Corporation. Lukensmeyer Associates has also facilitated leadership and management retreats for several areas of the federal government, including: the Department of Agriculture, the Department of Commerce, the Department of Health and Human Services, Immigration and Naturalization Services, the National Aeronautics and Space Administration (NASA), the National Oceanographic and Atmospheric Administration, the National Rail Passenger Service Corporation (Amtrak), and the Office of Public Health and Science. With all of the listed organizations, Lukensmeyer took a lead role in developing a strategic direction for the agency, identifying performance measures, and committing to an implementation schedule with deadlines and milestones.

=== Americans Discuss Social Security ===
From 1997 to 1999, Lukensmeyer was the executive director of Americans Discuss Social Security (ADSS), a $12.5 million project of The Pew Charitable Trusts. Americans Discuss Social Security's mission was to engage American citizens from all different demographic groups and backgrounds in a national debate about the future of Social Security. The conclusions from ADSS would provide policy-makers in Congress with a framework for resolving the issue. From October 1997 to June 1998, community forums were held in twenty five states. ADSS engaged and informed more than 45,000 Americans who reflected the country's population with respect to age, income, gender, rural or urban residence, and ethno-racial background.

== Education ==
During her undergraduate education at The University of Iowa, Lukensmeyer organized meetings between faculty and students to bring back order to the university during the turbulent times of the 1960s. In 1967, Lukensmeyer was one of only three women admitted to Harvard Law School; she decided she would not attend law school and instead opted to enter the field of organizational behavior. Lukensmeyer has a doctorate in organizational behavior from Case Western Reserve University and post-graduate training at the internationally known Gestalt Institute of Cleveland. After finishing her post-doctoral work at the Gestalt Institute, Lukensmeyer helped establish the Institute as a world-class training facility in the application of Gestalt theory and methodology. She helped create the first Gestalt post-graduate training program related to organizations and institutions. Additionally, Lukensmeyer has enhanced the curricula of law schools, liberal arts schools, postgraduate training institutes, and corporate development programs.

== Professional associations ==
- In 1996, Lukensmeyer was elected as a fellow of the National Academy of Public Administration.
- Deliberative Democracy Consortium, Chair
- American Management Association
- National Training Laboratories
- Organization Development Network
- Organization and Management Division of the American Psychological Association
- The Fielding Graduate University, where she sits on the Board
- Service Advisory Board of the International Freedom Center
- Certified Consultants International, charter member

== Awards ==
- International Association for Public Participation 2001
- International Association for Public Participation 2003
- Organizational Development Network's Sharing the Wealth Award 2006
- Housing and Urban Development (HUD) for best practices
- Distinguished Service Award from the Federal Managers Association for Outstanding Leadership 1994
- Best Practice Award from the National Training Laboratories Institute in 1993

== Publications ==
- Lukensmeyer, Carolyn with Wendy Jacobson. Bringing Citizen Voices to the Table. A Guide for Public Managers. San Francisco, CA: Jossey Bass, 2013.
- Lukensmeyer, Carolyn. "Large-Scale Citizen Engagement and the Rebuilding of New Orleans: A Case Study" National Civic Review vol. 96 no. 3
- Lukensmeyer, Carolyn with Wendy Jacobson and Lars Torres. "Institutionalizing Large-Scale Engagements in Governance: A Link Between Theory and Practice" "Beyond e-Government and e-Democracy: A Global Perspective". Ed. Alan R. Shark and Sylviane Toporkoff. Booksurge, 2008. 59-76.
- Lukensmeyer, Carolyn and Lars Hasselblad Torres. "Public Deliberation: A Manager's Guide to Citizen Deliberation" IBM's Center for the Business of Government 2006
- Lukensmeyer, Carolyn and Steve Brigham. "Taking Democracy to Scale: Large Scale Interventions for Citizens" Journal of Applied Behavioral Science Vol. 41 No. 1, March 2005
- Lukensmeyer, Carolyn. "A Town Meeting for the Twenty-First Century" The Deliberative Democracy Handbook: Strategies for Effective Civic Engagement in the Twenty-First Century John Gastil (Editor), Peter Levine (Editor). June 2005
- Lukensmeyer, Carolyn with Goldman, A NATIONAL TOWN HALL: Bringing Citizens Together Through Interactive Video Teleconferencing, Washington, D.C.: The Tides Center - Americans Discuss Social Security, 1999.
- "A View from the Inside: Interview with Carolyn Lukensmeyer," Government Works: Profiles of People Making a Difference, Alexandria, VA: Miles River Press, 1995.
- Lukensmeyer and Hyde, "Good Politics is Good Organization: Revitalizing the Bureaucracy," Briefing Papers on Strategic Design for Transition, Leadership for a New America, Team Development and Executive Selection, Citizen Participation and Public Consensus and New Priorities, October 1992.
- Lukensmeyer, "Commentary," Governing Magazine, November 1990.
- Lukensmeyer, "Managing the Dilemma: Governor's Staff and Cabinet," Women Executives in State Government Newsletter, September 1988.
