= Michael D. Fricklas =

American lawyer

Michael D. Fricklas is an American lawyer and an executive in the entertainment industry. He is Chief Legal Officer and Corporate Secretary of Advance Publications. Previously, he was executive vice president, general counsel and secretary of Viacom Inc. (and preceding companies) from 1993 to 2017, and general counsel from 1998 to 2017. Viacom is now known as Paramount Global.

Fricklas is also a past president of the Association of General Counsel and a recipient of the Association of Corporate Counsel’s "Excellence in Corporate Practice" Award for "achievement in service to the legal profession and improvement of the legal system," the association said.

Prior to his departure from Viacom in April 2017, Fricklas ranked among the highest-paid chief legal officers in America, with a total compensation of over 6 million dollars.

Fricklas is responsible for all legal and governmental affairs for Advance.

== Viacom ==
While at Viacom, Fricklas was responsible for the company's legal and business affairs, including television, motion pictures, online and on mobile platforms for the company's brands which included MTV, VH1, Nickelodeon, BET, Comedy Central, Spike, TV Land, CMT, Paramount Pictures, among others. During his tenure, such brands also included CBS Simon & Schuster, Showtime, Blockbuster, Paramount Parks, CBS Television and many others.

=== Key responsibilities ===
While at Viacom, Fricklas' portfolio included large transactions and financings, capital raising transactions, management of technology, real estate, risk management and compliance matters and government affairs. He also created Viacom's cybersecurity governance program; he initiated and managed privacy and anti-piracy operations. Fricklas' responsibilities for content protection and IP put him out front on Viacom's decision to sue Google for copyright infringement at YouTube.

=== Highly reported matters ===
YouTube Litigation: Fricklas was the architect of Viacom's $1 billion lawsuit against Google/YouTube. Viacom initially lost the case, and continued to lose on appeal, and eventually walked away with a confidential settlement where no money changed hands. It was widely considered that Google won the legal battle.

The New York Times "Deal Book" writer, Steven Davidoff Solomon, among critics of the litigation, chided Fricklas for creating "a case that just served to make a crazy situation crazier while wasting millions of dollars." Ultimately, Fricklas was credited for "helping to shape the rules of the road in posting online content," and The New York Times noted that Viacom saw, in the settlement with the book publishers, an acknowledgement that Google needed to pay creators.

Redstone Corporate Control Litigation: Fricklas was substantively involved in the legal issues surrounding the Redstone family war for corporate control and operating responsibility.

CBS: Fricklas worked on deals to tie and untie Viacom with CBS, including Viacom's merger with CBS (2000), split-off with CBS Corp. (2005), and the Blockbuster split-off (2004). In 2016, Fricklas was at the head of the impending transaction that broke-off negotiations for a merger between the companies.

Viacom Headquarters Lease: Fricklas did the deal that built out the company's space to 1.6 million square feet for its Times Square headquarters office, a big economic win for New York City, according to Real Estate Weekly.

=== Viacom Legal Department notable initiatives ===
Cited as one of the "four best legal departments in the country" in 2016, Corporate Counsel recognized the Viacom in-house legal team under Fricklas for its protection of the company's intellectual property, and as a leader in legal automation, including leading edge e-discovery and document management.

== Early career ==
Prior to his 25-year career at Viacom, Fricklas was vice president, general counsel & secretary of Minorco, (U.S.A.) Inc. (now part of Anglo American PLC) and served on the board of its subsidiary, Hudson Bay Mining, and before that a corporate lawyer with Shearman & Sterling and a predecessor of DLA Piper where he first worked on technology licensing for Silicon Valley–based technology companies.

== Directorships and other leadership (volunteer organizations) ==
Fricklas participates in a variety of volunteer activities:

- Boston University, Board of Trustees.
- Boston University School of Law Dean's advisory board.
- Member of the planning committee for the Tulane Corporate Law Institute.
- New York's Permanent Commission on Access to justice, member (current).
- Advisory board of the Legal Aid Society.

He is also secretary and a member of the board of directors of Jazz at Lincoln Center and co-chair of the UJA Entertainment Media and Communications Division (current).

== Publications, lectures, and videos ==
Fricklas has served as a panelist at conferences, bar associations and university classes on varied topics such as communications law, cybersecurity, copyright, corporate governance, mergers & acquisitions, litigation and law department management. He has been a speaker at Harvard, NYU, Columbia, Yale, Boston University, University of Colorado, the Legal Talk Network and the Lattice Society among others.

- Law School of NYU International Legal Roundtable on Cross Border Investment and M&A Rebalancing the World Order in Global M&A and Strategic Cross-Border Transactions 2013.
- Digital rights management (DRM) lecture to a Yale Law class.
- Speaker at University of Colorado: Accelerate Your In-House Career January 4–8, 2016 University of Colorado Law School Corporate Counsel Intensive Institute.
- Viacom's top lawyer tells Beet TV: Mash Ups are fine, but Copying is not Fair Use.
- Our Case Against YouTube.
- Panelist on “The future of the Internet” at Berkman Center for Internet and Society, May 16, 2008.

== Honors and awards ==
Fricklas has been recognized as a legal expert and contributor in the entertainment industry and is the recipient of various awards noted in speaker biographies, such as Silicon Flatirons, which are provided for his classes, keynotes, and panelist engagements.

- America's 50 Outstanding General Counsels, National Law Journal (April 11, 2016).
- Counsel of the Year Award from the Association of Media and Entertainment Counsel.
- The Legal 500 2014 Entertainment Individual of the Year.
- Economic Justice award from the National Center for Law and Economic Justice.
- Boston University School of Law's "Silver Shingle" for distinguished service to the school of law.
- New York County Lawyers Association’s “William Nelson Cromwell Award.”

== Academic background ==
Bar Admissions: California: 1984; Colorado: 1990; New York: 1993

Fricklas received a B.S.E.E. from the University of Colorado's College of Engineering and Applied Sciences in 1981 and a J.D., magna cum laude, from Boston University School of Law in 1984.
