= Postpartisan =

Post-partisanship is an approach to dispute resolution between political factions that emphasizes compromise and collaboration over political ideology and party discipline. It does not imply neutrality. Usage of the term has grown since 2008 as the concept takes hold among policy-makers. The New York Times has attributed an oblique reference to postpartisan idealism in a statement by US President Thomas Jefferson, when he declared in his inaugural address in 1801: "We are all Republicans, we are all Federalists."

== Post-partisanship and the 2008 US presidential election ==
Often invoked by supporters of both 2008 US presidential candidates Barack Obama and John McCain, its modern renaissance dates back to a Los Angeles conference hosted June 18–19, 2007, by the USC Annenberg School for Communication, to "explore ways to improve political dialogue and decision making."

William Safire, the late New York Times language maven, finds the first media reference to post-partisanship in a February 1976 article in the Times about a "disenchanted electorate" that preceded the Ford-Carter campaign: "It is within the fluid and independent middle," he quotes Christopher Lydon as saying, "that could shape new parties, realign the old ones or extend the history of erosion into a new 'post-partisan' era".

Despite this journalistic heritage, it was at the Annenberg Conference in Los Angeles – titled Ceasefire! Bridging the Political Divide – that the concept of post-partisanship was studied, explained and celebrated by two modern politicians: Republican governor of California Arnold Schwarzenegger and New York mayor Michael Bloomberg (a former Democrat, later re-elected as a Republican in 2005).

In a nutshell, according to entrepreneur and health policy researcher Neil Seeman, post-partisanship means involving all sides early in contemplating problems to complex policy issues - taking dialogue seriously and driving to the best solution that has maximum feasibility and impact. Mark Satin, editor of Radical Middle Newsletter, an online journal, has articulated what he calls the 10 principles of post-partisanship (Satin 2007), as derived from the Los Angeles conference.

== The 10 principles of post-partisanship ==
1. Relationships are as important as convictions.
2. Criticism needs to be well-balanced by self-criticism.
3. There must be an overriding commitment to dialogue and deliberation.
4. There must be an overriding commitment to diversity of opinions and perspectives.
5. Compromise is not the only endgame.
6. Be simultaneously creative and practical.
7. Demonstrate a penchant for big ideas.
8. Support a bias for action.
9. Demonstrate concern with values and principles.
10. Have a long-term vision.

Health innovation researcher Neil Seeman was the first to apply these principles to health policy decision-making, specifically to public health (Seeman, 2008). A former lawyer for the conservative-leaning National Citizen's Coalition of Canada (once headed by Prime Minister Stephen Harper) and former Fraser Institute research fellow, Seeman is a member of a growing number of policy thinkers who advocate for the application of post-partisanship to policy-making. Currently a Senior Resident at Massey College at the University of Toronto and an adjunct Professor of Health Services Management at Toronto Metropolitan University, Seeman writes frequently on health system innovation and the application of Web 2.0 and social network analysis in health care ("Health 2.0"). He currently writes on health innovation for Canada's National Post and many peer-reviewed and other publications.

Other observers dispute the notion of post-partisanship. In a December 2008 New York Times article, Dan Mitchell, an economic analyst at the free-market Cato Institute, noted: "I don't think there is such a thing as post-partisan or post-ideological politics, but there is such a thing as one side being so shell-shocked and/or incompetent that it is incapable of presenting an alternative vision."

In an October 2008 "open letter" to Canada's conservative Prime Minister Stephen Harper, Seeman advises Harper to "try a post-partisan approach to public health policy." Seeman distinguishes between bipartisanship and postpartisanship. He writes: "Bipartisanship is horse-trading – in its best incarnation, this means crafting patchwork legislation that allows all sides to feel satisfied that some thread of their vision or ideological essence found its way into law. The process plays to ego, not good policy."

== Postpartisan decision making ==
Postpartisan decision-making, in advance of landing on any final policy proposal, allows multi-sector partners to select weighted solution criteria (a process formally referred to as multi-criteria decision analysis). The process enables a neutral, independent commission with assigned legislative power (comprising members nominated by all parties) to identify the cognitive and partisan biases that may have inadvertently crept into any final, recommended policy solutions. Pointing by way of example to California's success in constraining teenage pregnancy, Seeman writes:

"We have seen dividends come from such an approach in the arena of public health. Consider that Gov. Schwarzenegger’s state has witnessed a dramatic percentage decline in teen pregnancy rates. This is especially impressive since it occurred during mass migration to the state of sub-populations with very high teen pregnancy rates such as those seen outside of California.

California’s ambitious plan to curb teenage pregnancy – as with the governor’s new leadership in the battle against childhood obesity through mandated school physical activity- and healthy-lunch initiatives – would never have taken place but for Mr. Schwarzenegger’s continued openness to opposing viewpoints."

== See also ==
- Bipartisanship
- Nonpartisan
- Partisanship
- Transpartisan
- Collaboration
- Moderation
