= Philip K. Howard =

American lawyer and writer

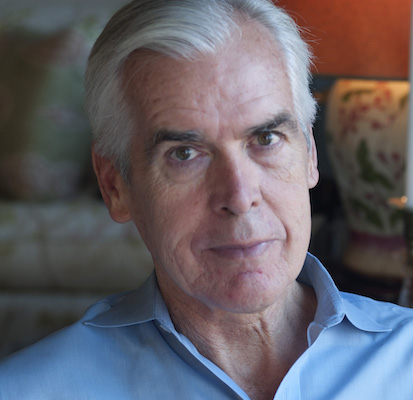
- Philip K. Howard
- Born: October 24, 1948 (age 77); Atlanta, Georgia, U.S.
- Education: The Taft School; Yale University (BA); University of Virginia School of Law (JD)
- Website: philipkhoward.com

Philip King Howard (born October 24, 1948) is an American lawyer and writer. His writing examines how modern law and bureaucracy affect human behavior and the functioning of society. He founded Common Good, a nonpartisan, nonprofit organization which advocates simplifying government.

== Early life and education ==
Howard was born in Atlanta, Georgia on October 24, 1948 and grew up in Eastern Kentucky, the son of a Presbyterian minister. He attended the Taft School on scholarship, from which he later received the 2018 Horace Dutton Taft Alumni Medal. He also attended Yale College, and the University of Virginia Law School.

== Career ==
Howard practiced law at Sullivan & Cromwell before starting a firm, Howard, Darby & Levin (later Howard, Smith & Levin). In 1999, his firm merged with Covington & Burling, where Howard became Vice-Chair and, after his retirement from the partnership, became senior counsel.

Howard is the author of The Death of Common Sense (1995), The Collapse of the Common Good (2002), Life Without Lawyers (2009), The Rule of Nobody (2014), Try Common Sense (2019), Not Accountable (2023), Everyday Freedom (2024), and Saving Can Do: How to Revive the Spirit of America (2025). The Death of Common Sense, which criticized over-regulation and excessive litigation, became a bestseller. Howard also founded and heads Common Good, a nonprofit that advocates for simpler, goal-oriented regulation and reliable boundaries on litigation. The organization's Board of Directors has included Bill Bradley, Tom Kean, George McGovern, and Alan Simpson.

In a partnership with the Harvard School of Public Health, Howard proposed special health courts for the handling of medical malpractice suits. In 2012, Howard curated a six-month series for The Atlantic called "America the Fixable," which featured numerous guest writers giving their reform ideas on specific topics. In January 2017, Howard argued that the collective bargaining in the current civil service system is unconstitutional and should be replaced by executive order. In a 2019 paper published by the Center on Capitalism and Society at Columbia University, he explored "Bureaucracy vs. Democracy: Examining the bureaucratic causes of public failure, economic repression, and voter alienation." In a paper published by the C. Boyden Gray Center for the Study of the Administrative State at George Mason University Law School, he makes the case for "Restoring Accountability to the Executive Branch." In a 2021 paper published by Yale Law Journal, "From Progressivism to Paralysis," Howard traces how the Progressive Movement's vision of neutral public administration evolved into public paralysis. In a column for The Washington Post commenting on the paper, George F. Will wrote: "So, 'slowly but inevitably a sense of powerlessness' pervades public and private institutions."

In April 2017, Howard joined President Donald Trump's Strategic and Policy Forum, advising on infrastructure permitting. The Forum was disbanded in August 2017 following controversy over Trump's response to the Charlottesville attacks His 2015 report "Two Years, Not Ten Years," detailing the economic and environmental costs of delaying infrastructure approvals, has influenced the Trump Administration's infrastructure proposals, including their call for approvals to be made within two years. Critics such as the Natural Resources Defense Council disagree with the report's findings, arguing that money, not permits, is the reason infrastructure projects are delayed, and that Howard's report relied on outdated statistics. The Trump administration's infrastructure proposals, released in February 2018 and July 2020, contained many of the recommendations from the report.

In a 2019 article in The Hill, Howard characterized his political perspective as radical centrist. In June 2020, Howard launched the nonpartisan Campaign for Common Good calling for "spring cleaning commissions" and proposing simplified government regulation in areas like healthcare and education. Howard is a former chairman of the Municipal Art Society of New York, and was co-recipient of the Jacqueline Kennedy Onassis Medal in 2020. He also chaired the committee that organized the Tribute in Light memorial for victims of the September 11 attacks.

== Reception ==
Howard's work has been praised by New York Times columnist David Brooks and Washington Post columnist George Will, the latter of whom called Life Without Lawyers "2009's most needed book on public affairs". In contrast, Consumer Watchdog has accused Howard of having "a deep disregard for public use of the justice system" and favoring corporate over consumer interests. In a Newsweek review of Life Without Lawyers, Dahlia Lithwick criticized Howard for ignoring the value of other areas of law when pushing for tort and malpractice reform, writing that "the one thing scarier than a bus full of lawyers is a bus without them."

Between 2010 and 2014, Howard was a guest on The Daily Show with Jon Stewart three times, where he talked about starting a movement to streamline government and restore individual responsibility at every level of society.

The Rule of Nobody was shortlisted for the Hayek Book Prize of the Manhattan Institute in both 2015 and 2016.

Writing in The Washington Post, Robert Litan described Try Common Sense as a call "for pushing a giant reset button" and noted that Howard "makes a convincing case that in many ways government doesn't work." Writing in The New York Times, Mark Green described the book as a "jeremiad against 'regulation'." In April 2020, New York Times columnist Bret Stephens wrote that Howard had "the right idea" in proposing a "Recovery Authority" to help America come out of the COVID crisis. Not Accountable has been reviewed favorably by the Wall Street Journal and other outlets. In his newsletter, Sanity Clause, Joe Klein called Not Accountable "the clearest case against this flagrant distortion of American democracy." Union leader Randi Weingarten criticized the book as "a barrage of empty right-wing rhetoric." In discussing Everyday Freedom, Francis Fukuyama wrote "Philip's argument is an important one that needs to be made."

== Personal life ==
Howard married Alexandra Olivia Cochrane Cushing in Nov 1972. They reside in Manhattan and have four children.

== Publications ==
External videos
- Booknotes interview with Howard on The Death of Common Sense, February 12, 1995, C-SPAN
- Presentation by Howard on The Lost Art of Drawing the Line, May 8, 2001, C-SPAN
- After Words interview with Howard on Life Without Lawyers, February 14, 2009, C-SPAN
- Panel discussion with Howard on The Rule of Nobody, May 13, 2014, C-SPAN

- Howard, Philip K. (1995). The Death of Common Sense: How Law is Suffocating America. New York: Random House (hardcover). ISBN 0-679-42994-8.
- Howard, Philip K. (2002). The Collapse of the Common Good: How America's Lawsuit Culture Undermines Our Freedom. New York: Ballantine Books (paperback). ISBN 978-0-345-43871-3. (originally titled: The Lost Art of Drawing the Line)
- Howard, Philip K. (2009). Life Without Lawyers: Liberating Americans from Too Much Law. New York: W. W. Norton & Company (hardcover). ISBN 978-0-393-06566-4.
- Howard, Philip K. (2014). The Rule of Nobody: Saving America from Dead Laws and Broken Government. New York: W. W. Norton & Company (hardcover). ISBN 978-0-393-08282-1.
- Howard, Philip K. (2019). Try Common Sense: Replacing the Failed Ideologies of Right and Left. New York: W. W. Norton & Company (hardcover). ISBN 978-1-324-00176-8.
- Howard, Philip K. (2023). Not Accountable: Rethinking the Constitutionality of Public Employee Unionsing the Constitutionality of Public Employee Unions. Rodin Books (hardcover). ISBN 978-1-957588-14-8.
- Howard, Philip K. (2024). Everyday Freedom: Designing the Framework for a Flourishing Society. Rodin Books (hardcover). ISBN 978-1957588209.

Howard also wrote the introduction to Al Gore's book Common Sense Government.

- Gore, Al (1995). Common Sense Government : Works Better and Costs Less. Random House. ISBN 9780679771326. OCLC 852738628.
