= AmericaSpeaks =

Non-profit organization from 1995-2014

AmericaSpeaks was a Washington, D.C.–based non-governmental organization that operated from 1995 to 2014. Its mission was to engage citizens in discussing and influencing public decisions and serve as a counterweight to special interest groups. It introduced the concept of the "21st Century Town Meeting", a format that attempted to take the traditional New England town meeting to a larger scale through the use of modern technology. Widely cited as an example of deliberative democracy, its methodology relied on mini-publics, defined as "the randomized selection of citizens to discuss public matters in small groups", as well as large-group intervention (LGI) to influence organizational change. It applied the concept of expert publics, recognizing that members of the general public can develop knowledge and expertise through their own experience of an issue or problem. At the same time, the organization worked closely with policymakers to define the scope and choices to be discussed, arguing that the data collected would be directly relevant and more likely to influence outcomes.

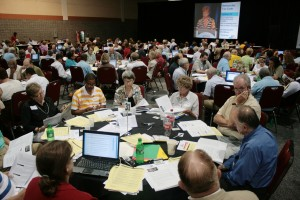
2011 AmericaSpeaks event

The group was founded as a nonpartisan nonprofit organization by activist and author Carolyn Lukensmeyer. When its closure was announced in 2014, AmericaSpeaks claimed that it had engaged 180,000 people across 150 projects. Forums organized by AmericaSpeaks included "Our Budget, Our Economy" (2010), a public deliberation about the national debt involving 3,000 people in 19 communities across the United States. In 2007, AmericaSpeaks worked with city government officials to conduct a series of town meetings on rebuilding New Orleans following Hurricane Katrina, involving citizens who had been displaced via telecasts and online. In Chicago, AmericaSpeaks worked with the Northeastern Illinois Planning Commission (NIPC) to facilitate discussions around its Common Ground planning process. Other projects included bringing together 4,500 stakeholders to discuss the redevelopment of ground zero in New York City.

== Outcomes ==
Critics of AmericaSpeaks have pointed out the biases inherent in how specific topics were presented to forum participants; the lack of transparency in how decisions were made; and skepticism that the time and effort invested by participants would not matter in the end.

== See also ==
- Deliberative democracy
- Participatory democracy
- Public participation
- Town hall meeting
