= Sudanese Shadow Government =

Sudanese Shadow Government حكومة الظل السودانية
- Founded: December 2013
- Headquarters: Khartoum
- International affiliation: None

Website
- Official Website

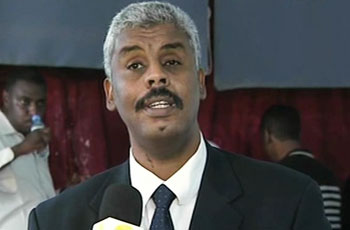
Wael Omer Abdin, one of the SSG's founder

The Sudanese Shadow Government is a political organization which announced its establishment on 24 December 2013 in Khartoum, Sudan. It is the first shadow government in Sudan.

A young Sudanese lawyer named Wael Omer Abdin called for the formation of a shadow government in Sudan in March 2011. The shadow government consists of seven ministers, and has the aim of putting pressure on the regime and influencing politics in the country.
