= Lawrence Chickering =

American public policy analyst and attorney

Allen Lawrence Chickering (February 3, 1941 - August 13, 2023) was an American public policy analyst, attorney and the founder and president of Educate Girls Globally.

Chickering was a research fellow at the Hoover Institution. He is the author of Beyond Left and Right: Breaking the Political Stalemate, Voice of the People: The Transpartisan Imperative in American Life and Strategic Foreign Assistance: Civil Society in International Security.

As president of Educate Girls Globally, he implemented a program for promoting girls’ education and empowering traditional communities by reforming government schools.
