= Draft evasion =

Intentional non-compliance with military conscription

Draft evasion or conscription evasion (also referred to pejoratively as draft dodging) is avoiding a government-imposed obligation to serve in the military forces. Sometimes draft evasion involves refusing to comply with the military draft laws. Illegal draft evasion is said to have characterized every military conflict of the 20th and 21st centuries, in which at least one party of such conflict has enforced conscription. Such evasion is generally considered to be a criminal offense, and laws against it go back thousands of years.

There are many draft evasion practices. Those that manage to adhere to or circumvent the law, and those that do not involve taking a public stand, are sometimes referred to as draft avoidance. Draft evaders are sometimes pejoratively referred to as draft dodgers, although in certain contexts that term has also been used non-judgmentally or as an honorific.

Practices that involve lawbreaking or taking a public stand are sometimes referred to as draft resistance. Although draft resistance is discussed below as a form of "draft evasion", draft resisters and scholars of draft resistance reject the categorization of resistance as a form of evasion or avoidance. Draft resisters argue that they seek to confront, not evade or avoid, the draft.

Draft evasion has been a significant phenomenon in countries as different as Belarus, Colombia, Eritrea, the Netherlands, Canada, France, Russia, South Korea, Syria, Ukraine, the United Kingdom and the United States. Accounts by scholars and journalists, along with memoiristic writings by draft evaders, indicate that the motives and beliefs of the evaders cannot be usefully stereotyped.

== Draft evasion practices ==
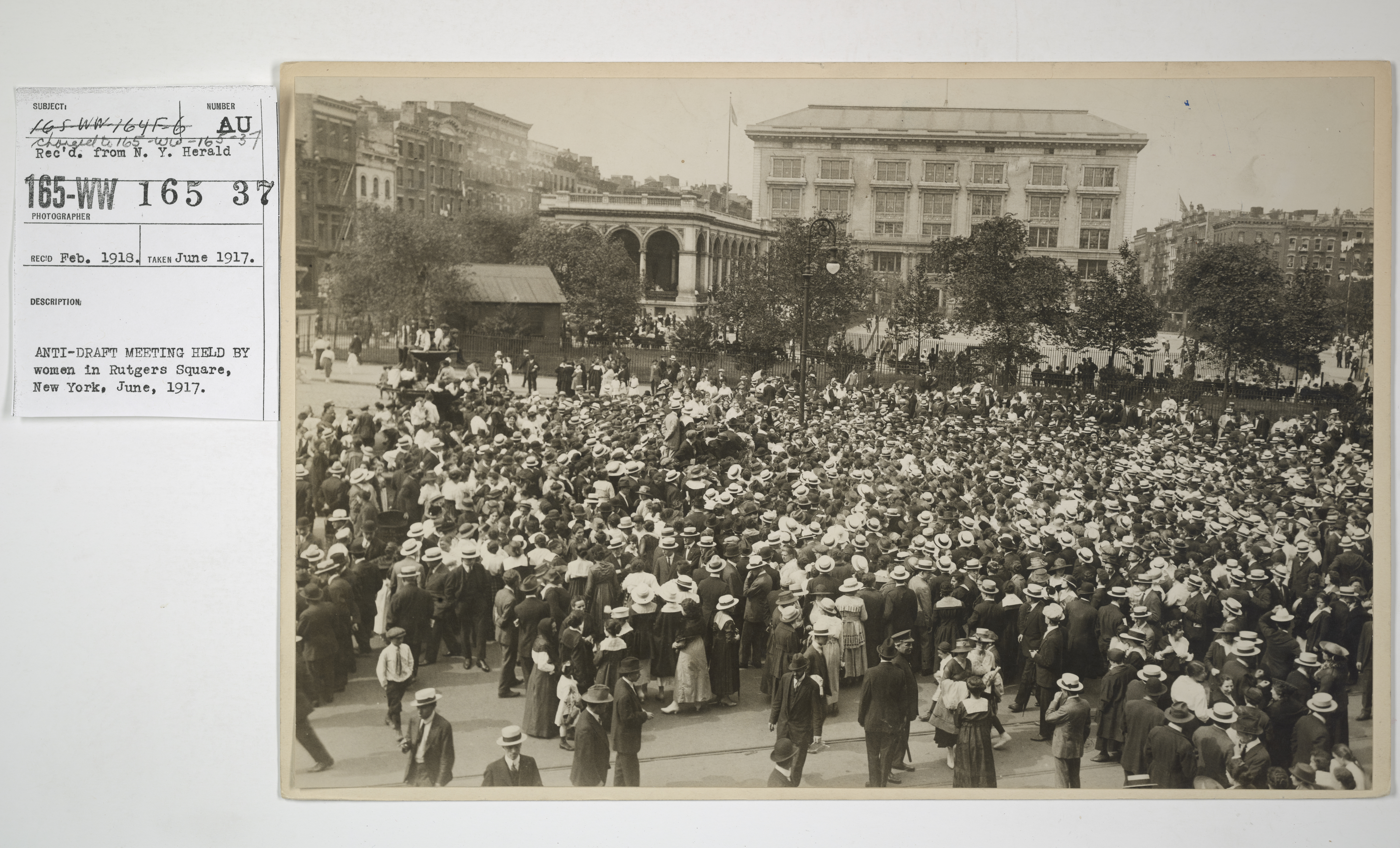
Anti-draft meeting held by women in New York City, 1917

Young people have engaged in a wide variety of draft evasion practices around the world, some of which date back thousands of years. This section aims to delineate a representative sampling of draft evasion practices and support activities as identified by scholars and journalists. Examples of many of these practices and activities can be found in the section on draft evasion in the nations of the world, further down this page.

=== Draft avoidance ===
One type of draft avoidance consists of attempts to follow the letter and spirit of the draft laws in order to obtain a legally valid draft deferment or exemption. Sometimes these deferments and exemptions are prompted by political considerations. Another type consists of attempts to circumvent, manipulate, or surreptitiously violate the substance or spirit of the draft laws in order to obtain a deferment or exemption. Nearly all attempts at draft avoidance are private and unpublicized. Examples include:

==== By adhering to the law ====
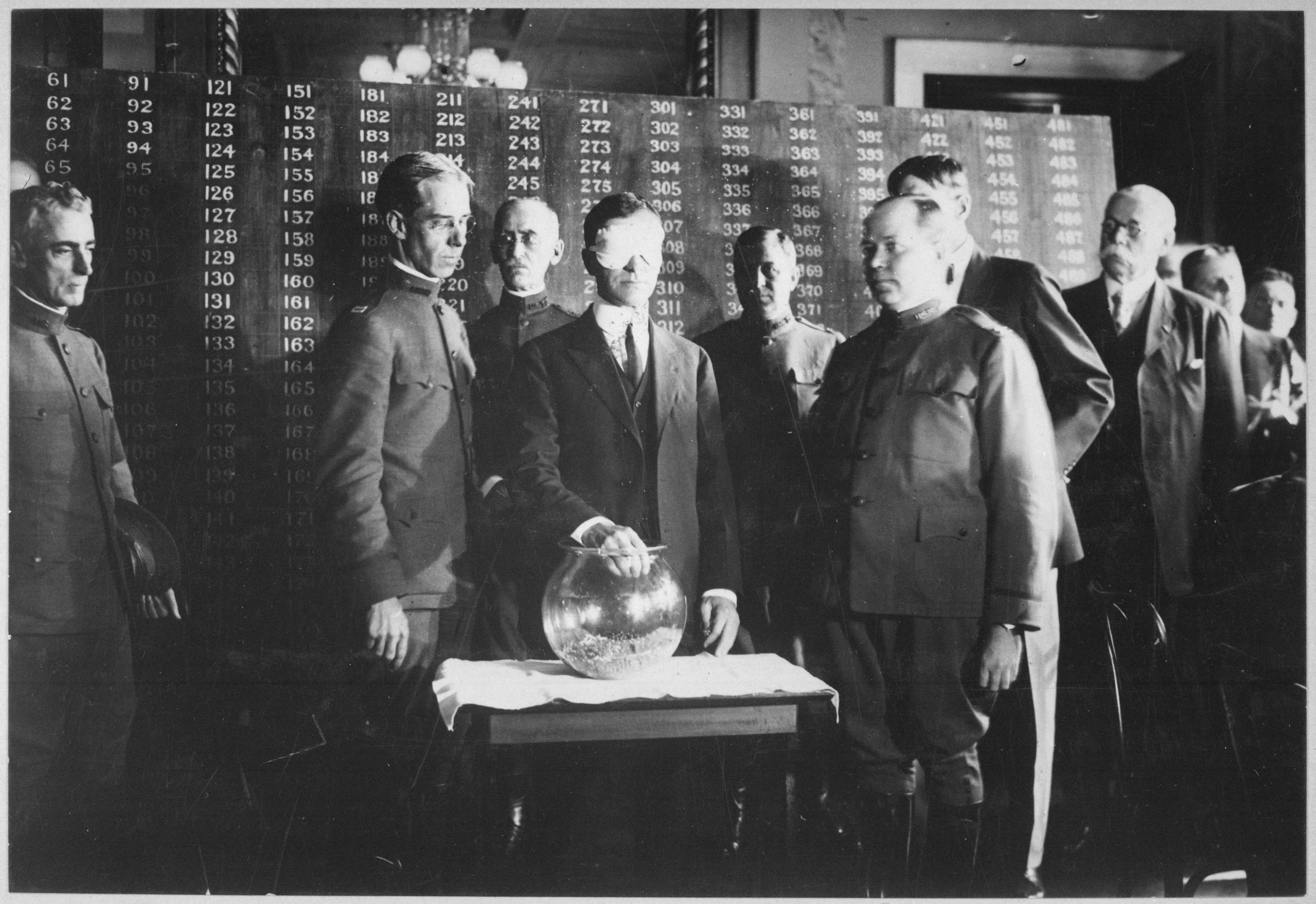
US Secretary of War Newton Baker drawing the first number in the World War I draft lottery, 1917

- Claiming conscientious objector status on the basis of sincerely held religious or ethical beliefs. (Note: Conscientious objector (CO) status does enable a recipient to avoid military service. However, COs who do not choose to perform non-combatant military service are generally required by their governments to perform civilian alternative service in the public or private sectors – typically conservation, health, or cultural work.)
- Claiming a student deferment, when one is in school primarily in order to study and learn.
- Claiming a medical or psychological problem, if the purported health issue is genuine and serious.
- Claiming economic hardship, if the hardship is genuine and the law recognizes such a claim.
- Holding a job in what the government considers to be an essential civilian occupation.
- Purchasing exemptions from military service, in nations where such payments are permitted.
- Not being chosen in a draft lottery, where lotteries determine the order of call to military service; or not being in a certain age group, where age determines the order of call.
- Not being able to afford armor or other equipment, in polities where conscripts were required to provide their own.

==== By circumventing the law ====
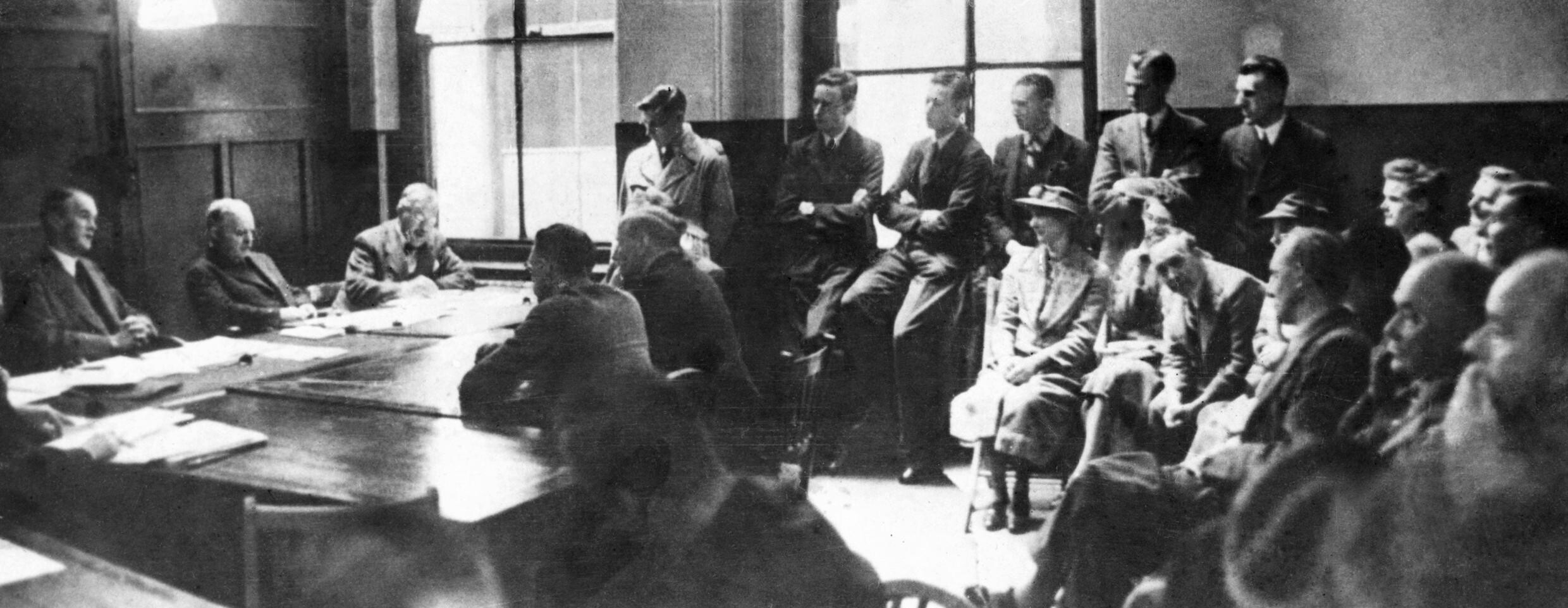
Tribunal for conscientious objectors in Britain during World War II

- Obtaining conscientious objector status by professing insincere religious or ethical beliefs.
- Obtaining a student deferment, if the student wishes to attend or remain in school largely to avoid the draft.
- Claiming a medical or psychological problem, if the purported problem is feigned, overstated, or self-inflicted.
- Finding a doctor who would certify a healthy draft-age person as medically unfit, either willingly or for pay.
- Deliberately self-injuring oneself.
- Becoming pregnant primarily in order to evade the draft, in nations where women who are not mothers are drafted.
- Falsely claiming to be homosexual, where the military excludes homosexuals.
- Deliberately failing one's military-related intelligence tests.
- Claiming economic hardship, if the purported hardship is overstated.
- Having someone exert personal influence on an officer in charge of the conscription process.
- Successfully bribing an officer in charge of the conscription process.

=== Draft resistance ===
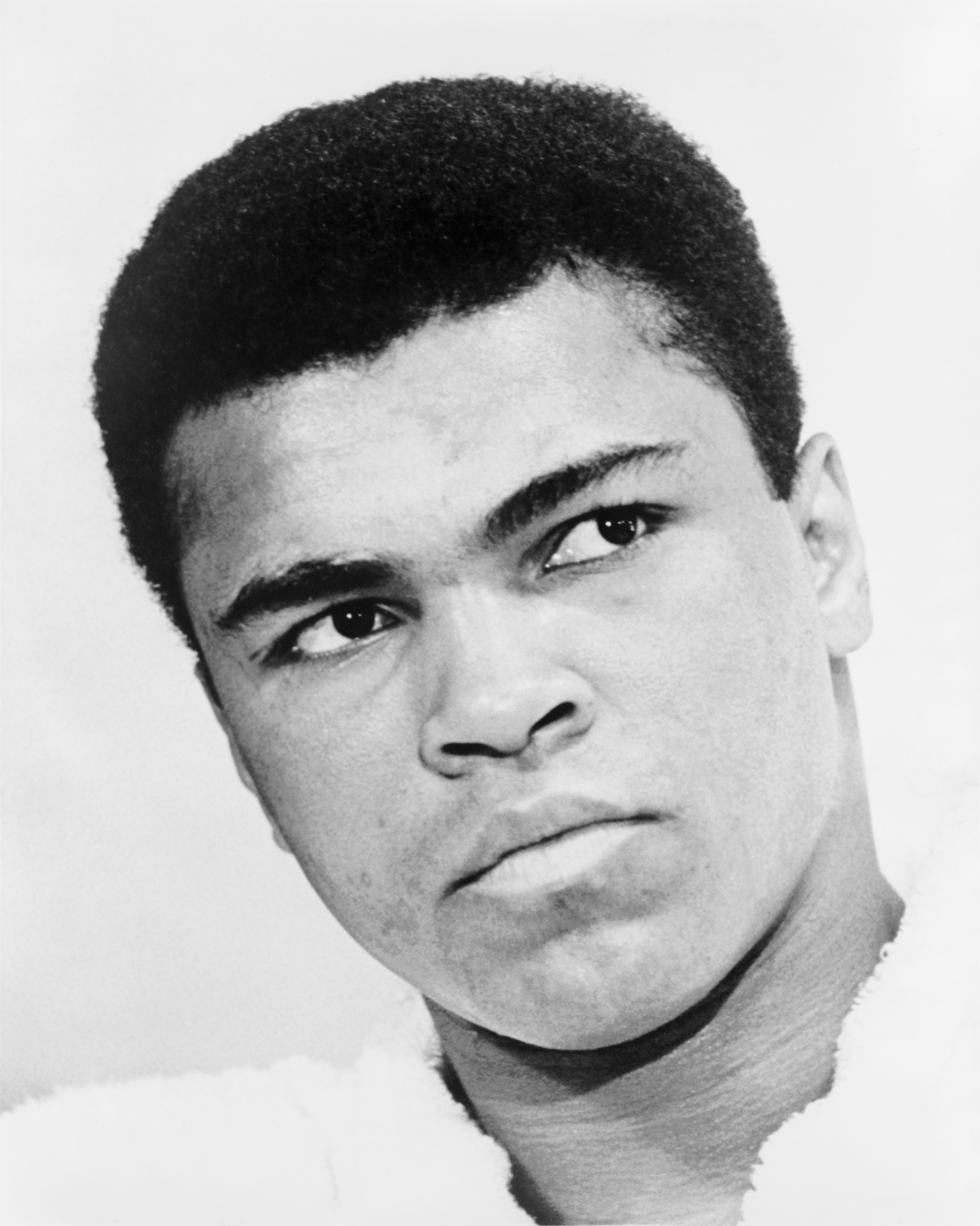
Muhammad Ali refused induction in 1967.

Draft evasion that involves overt lawbreaking or that communicates conscious or organized resistance to government policy is sometimes referred to as draft resistance. Examples include:

==== Actions by resisters ====
- Declining to register for the draft, in nations where that is required by law.
- Declining to report for one's draft-related physical examination, or for military induction or call-up, in nations where these are required by law.
- Participating in draft card burnings or turn-ins.
- Living "underground" (e.g., living with false identification papers) and working at an unreported job after being indicted for draft evasion.
- Traveling or emigrating to another country, rather than submitting to induction or to trial.
- Going to jail, rather than submitting to induction or to alternative government service.
- Shooting and/or killing draft officers and civil authorities.

==== Actions by supporters or resisters ====
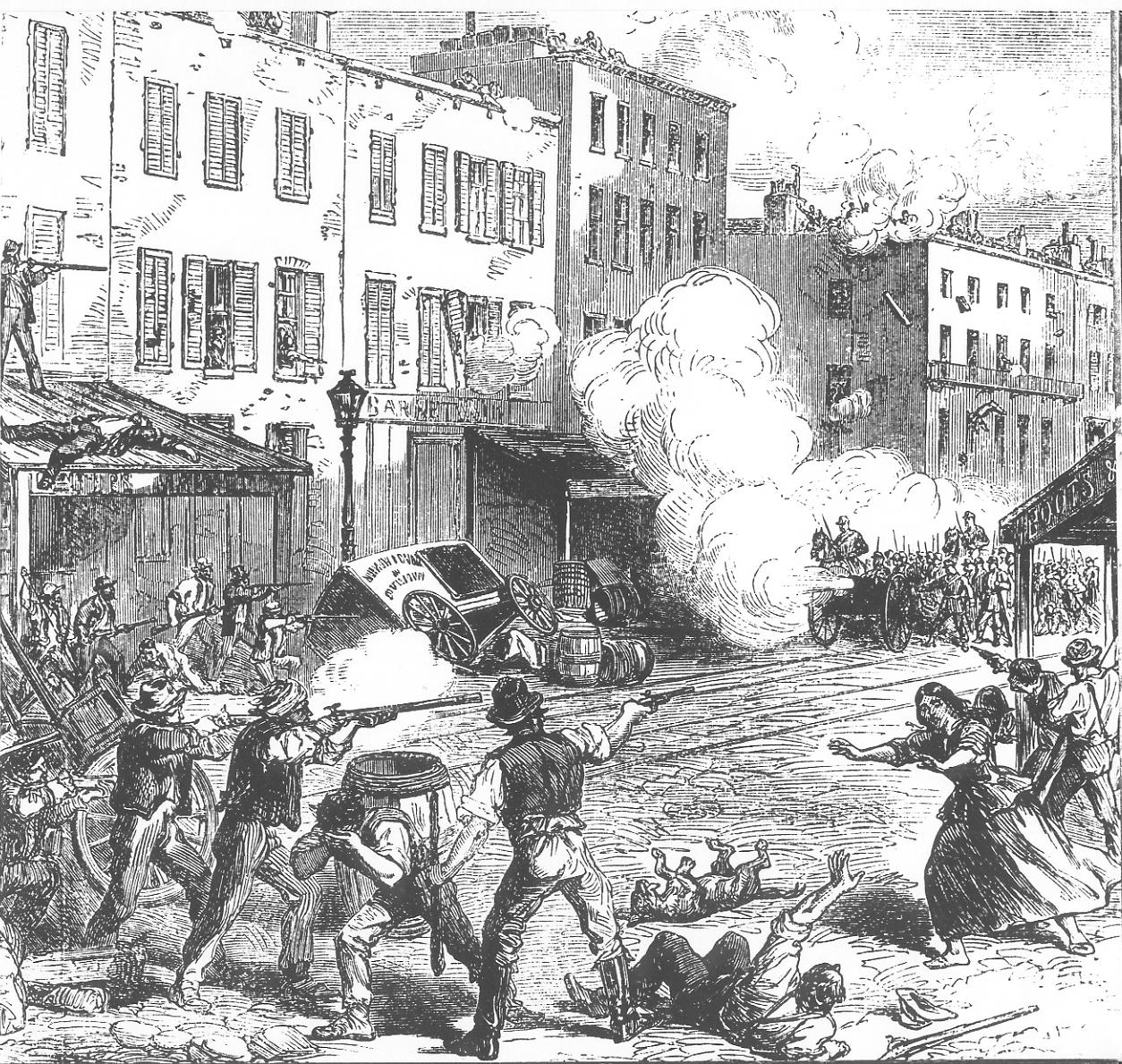
In 1863, anti-draft riots broke out in New York City.

- Organizing or participating in a peaceful street assembly or demonstration against the draft.
- Publicly encouraging, aiding, or abetting draft evaders.
- Deliberately disrupting a military draft agency's processes or procedures.
- Destroying a military draft agency's records.
- Organizing or participating in a riot against the draft.
- Building an anti-war movement that treats draft resistance as a vital and integral part of it.

== By country ==
Draft evasion is said to have characterized every military conflict of the 20th and 21st centuries. Laws against certain draft evasion practices go back at least as far as the ancient Greeks. Examples of draft evasion can be found in many nations over many time periods:

=== Australia ===
Australian men were conscripted to fight in the Vietnam War; as in the U.S., this was resisted.

=== Belgium ===
19th-century Belgium was one of the few places where most citizens accepted the practice of legally buying one's way out of the military draft, sometimes referred to as the practice of "purchasable military commutation". Even so, some Belgian politicians denounced it as a system that appeared to trade the money of the rich for the lives of the poor.

=== Britain ===
In January 1916, during World War I, the British government passed a military conscription bill. By July of that year, 30% of draftees had failed to report for service.

=== Canada ===
Canada employed a military draft during World Wars I and II, and some Canadians chose to evade it. According to Canadian historian Jack Granatstein, "no single issue has divided Canadians so sharply" as the military draft. During both World Wars, political parties collapsed or were torn apart over the draft issue, and ethnicity seeped into the equation, with most French Canadians opposing conscription and a majority of English Canadians accepting it. During both wars, riots and draft evasion followed the passage of the draft laws.

==== World War I ====
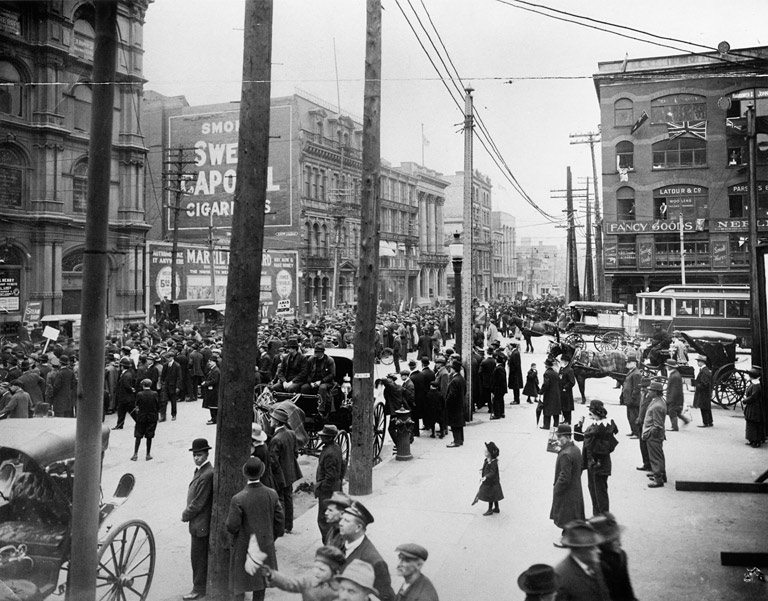
Anti-conscription march in Montreal, Quebec, Canada, May 1917

Conscription had been a dividing force in Canadian politics during World War I, and those divisions led to the Conscription Crisis of 1917. Canadians objected to conscription for diverse reasons: some thought it unnecessary, some did not identify with the British, and some felt it imposed unfair burdens on economically struggling segments of society. When the first draft class (single men between 20 and 34 years of age) was called up in 1917, nearly 281,000 of the approximately 404,000 men filed for exemptions. Throughout the war, some Canadians who feared conscription left for the United States or elsewhere.

==== World War II ====
Canada introduced an innovative kind of draft law in 1940 with the National Resources Mobilization Act. While the move was not unpopular outside French Canada, controversy arose because under the new law, conscripts were not compelled to serve outside Canada. They could choose simply to defend the country against invasion. By the middle of the war, many Canadians – not least of all, conscripts committed to overseas service – were referring to NRMA men pejoratively as "Zombies", that is, as dead-to-life or utterly useless. Following costly fighting in Italy, Normandy, and the Scheldt, overseas Canadian troops were depleted, and during the Conscription Crisis of 1944 a one-time levy of approximately 17,000 NRMA men was sent to fight abroad. Many NRMA men deserted after the levy rather than fight abroad. One brigade of NRMA men declared itself on "strike" after the levy.

The number of men who actively sought to evade the World War II draft in Canada is not known. Granatstein says the evasion was "widespread". In addition, in 1944 alone approximately 60,000 draftees were serving only as NRMA men, committed to border defense but not to fighting abroad.

=== Colombia ===
Colombia maintains a large and well-funded military, often focused on counter-insurgency. There is an obligatory military draft for all young men. Nevertheless, according to Public Radio International, two types of draft evasion are widespread in Colombia; one is prevalent among the relatively well-off, and another is found among the poor.

Young men from the middle-to-upper classes "usually" evade the Colombian draft. They do so by obtaining college or medical deferments, or by paying bribes for a "military ID card" certifying they have served – a card that is often requested by potential employers.

Young men from poorer circumstances sometimes simply avoid showing up for the draft and attempt to function without a military ID card. Besides facing limited employment prospects, these men are vulnerable to being forced into service through periodic army sweeps of poor neighborhoods.

=== Eritrea ===
Eritrea instituted a military draft in 1995. Three years later, it became open-ended; everyone under 50 [sic] can be enlisted for an indefinite period of time. According to The Economist, "release can depend on the arbitrary whim of a commander, and usually takes years".

It is illegal for Eritreans to leave the country without government permission. Nevertheless, in the mid-2010s around 2,000 Eritreans were leaving every month, "primarily to avoid the draft", according to The Economist. Human rights groups and the United Nations have also claimed that Eritrea's draft policies are fueling the migration. Most leave for Europe or neighboring countries; in 2015, Eritreans were the fourth largest group illicitly crossing the Mediterranean for Europe.

Mothers are usually excused from the Eritrean draft. The Economist says that, as a result, pregnancies among single women – once a taboo in Eritrea – have increased.

A 2018 article in Bloomberg News reported that Eritrea was considering altering some of its military draft policies.

=== Finland ===
During World War II, there was no legal way to avoid the draft, and failure to obey was treated as insubordination or desertion, punished by execution or jail. Draft evaders were forced to escape to the forests and live there as outlaws, in a practice that was facetiously called serving in the käpykaarti (Pine Cone Guard) or metsäkaarti (Forest Guard).

Approximately 1,500 men failed to show up for the draft at the start of the Continuation War (1941–1944, pitting Finland against the Soviet Union), and 32,186 cases of desertion were handled by the courts. There were numerous reasons for draft evasion and desertion during this period: fear or war-weariness, objection to the war as an offensive war, ideological objections or outright support for Communism. Finnish Communists were considered dangerous and could not serve, and were subject to "protective custody" – in practice, detention in a prison for the course of the war – because earlier attempts to conscript them had ended in disaster: one battalion called Pärmin pataljoona assembled from detained Communists suffered a large-scale defection to the Soviet side.

The käpykaarti (forest-dwelling Pine Cone Guard, mentioned above) was a diverse group including draft evaders, deserters, Communists, and Soviet desants (military skydivers). They lived in small groups, sometimes even in military-style dugouts constructed from logs, and often maintained a rotation to guard their camps. They received support from sympathizers who could buy from the black market; failing that, they stole provisions to feed themselves. The Finnish Army and police actively searched for them, and if discovered, a firefight often ensued. The Finnish Communist Party was able to operate among draft evaders. Sixty-three death sentences were handed out to deserters; however, many of them were killed in military or police raids on their camps. Deserters captured near front lines would often be simply returned to the lines, but as the military situation deteriorated towards the end of the war, punishments were harsher: 61 of the death sentences given were in 1944, mostly in June and July during the Vyborg–Petrozavodsk Offensive, where Finnish forces were forced to retreat.

At the conclusion of the war, the Allied Control Commission immediately demanded an amnesty for draft evaders, and they were not further punished.

As of 2020, deliberate draft evasion is a rare phenomenon, since absence from a drafting event, in most cases, leads to an immediate search warrant. Evaders are taken by police officers to the draft board, or to the regional military office.

=== France ===
In France, the right of all draftees to purchase military exemption – introduced after the French Revolution – was abolished in 1870. One scholar refers to the permissible buy-out as a "bastard form of equality" that bore traces of the Ancien Régime.

==== Napoleonic era ====
Draft evasion was a big problem for the French military under Napoleon. Near the start of the Napoleonic Era (encompassing the Napoleonic Wars), it was estimated that about 200,000 people had either evaded a draft or deserted from the military, due to the surge in conscription; possibly facing harsh consequences. Around 1808, in the middle of the military conflict, the number was closer to 500,000. Around this time period, a gendarmerie was assembled, aiming to hunt for the people who deserted the military or dodged drafts; the French also enforced the mandatory carrying of passports, among other measures.

=== Israel ===
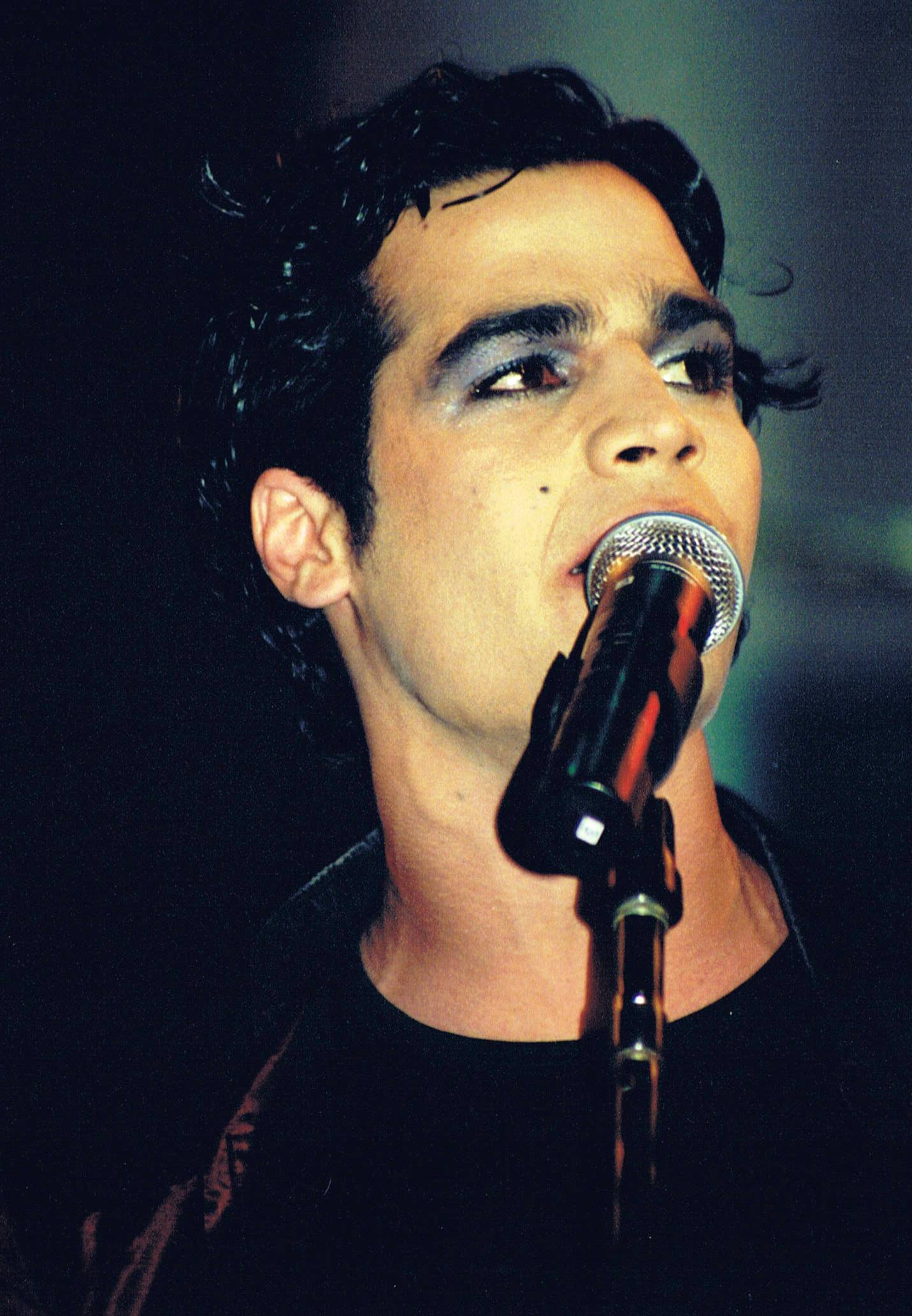
Rock star Aviv Geffen is one of several Israeli entertainers who have encouraged draft evasion.

There has always been a military draft in Israel. It is universal for all non-Arab Israeli citizens, men and women alike, and can legally be evaded only on physical or psychological grounds or by strictly Orthodox Jews, although the Israeli Supreme Court ruled to reject the latter exception in June 2024. The draft has become part of the fabric of Israeli society: according to Le Monde senior editor Sylvain Cypel, Israel is a place where military service is seen not just as a duty but a "certificate of entry into active life".

Yet by the middle of the decade of the 2000s, draft evasion (including outright draft refusal) and desertion had reached all-time highs. Fully 5% of young men and 3% of young women were supposedly failing their pre-military psychological tests, both all-time highs. Some popular entertainers, including rock star Aviv Geffen, grand-nephew of military hero Moshe Dayan, have been encouraging draft evasion (Geffen publicly said he would commit suicide if he were taken by the military). In 2007 the Israeli government initiated what some called a "shaming campaign", banning young entertainers from holding concerts and making television appearances if they failed to fulfill their military requirement. By 2008 over 3,000 high school students belonged to "Shministim" (Hebrew for twelfth graders), a group of young people claiming to be conscientiously opposed to military service. American actor Ed Asner wrote a column supporting the group. Another group, New Profile, was started by Israeli peace activists to encourage draft refusal.

University of Manchester sociologist Yulia Zemilinskaya has interviewed members of New Profile and Shministim, along with members of two groups of Israeli soldiers and reservists who have expressed an unwillingness to engage in missions they disapprove of – Yesh Gvul and Courage to Refuse. Despite commonalities, she found a difference between the draft refusers and the military selective-refusers:

The analysis of these interviews demonstrated that, in their appeal to [the] Israeli public, members of Yesh Gvul and Courage to Refuse utilized symbolic meanings and codes derived from dominant militarist and nationalist discourses. In contrast, draft-resisters, members of New Profile and Shministim, refusing to manipulate nationalistic and militaristic codes, voice a much more radical and comprehensive critique of the state’s war making plans. Invoking feminist, anti-militarist and pacifist ideologies, they openly challenge and criticize dominant militarist and Zionist discourses. While the majority of members of Yesh Gvul and Courage to Refuse choose selective refusal, negotiating conditions of their reserve duty, [the] anti-militarist, pacifist, and feminist ideological stance of members of New Profile and Shministim leads them to absolutist refusal.

=== Russia/Soviet Union ===
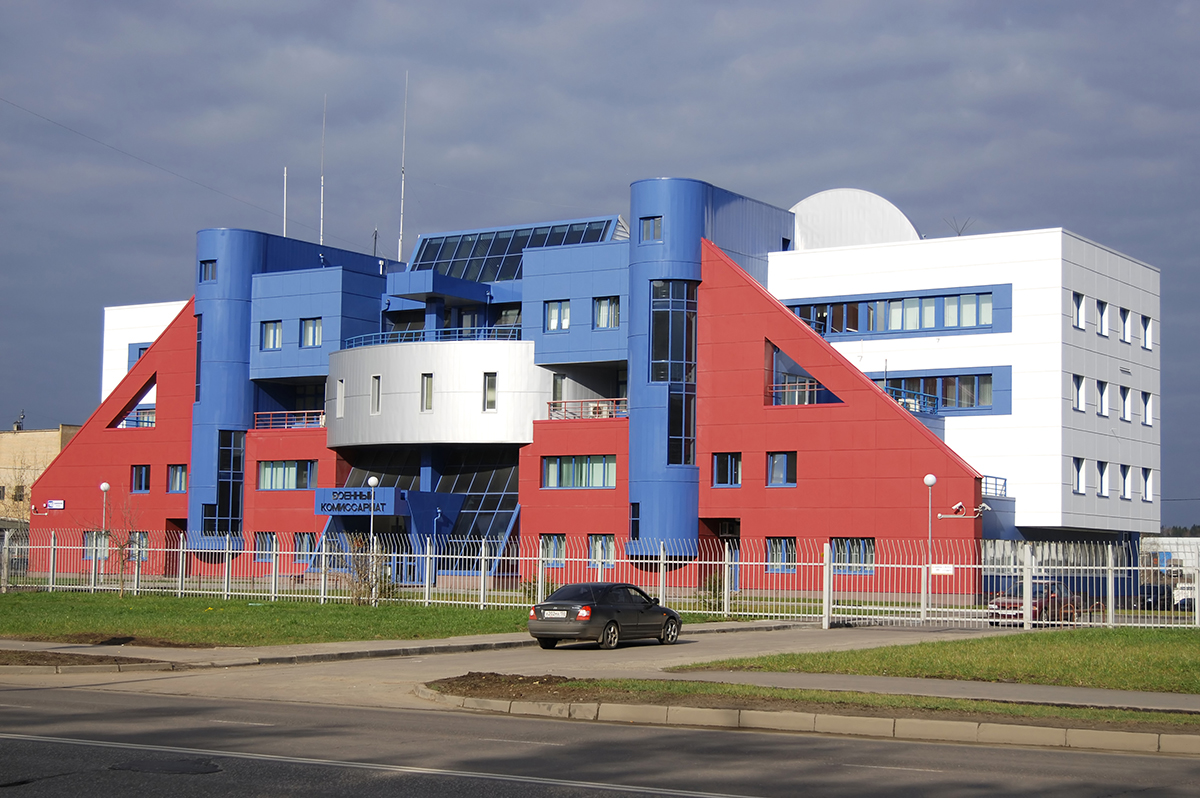
Draft registration office near Moscow. In the mid-2010s, half of all eligible Russians called up were reported to be evading service.

According to London-based journalist Elisabeth Braw, writing in Foreign Affairs, draft evasion was "endemic" in the Soviet Union during the Soviet–Afghan War, which ended with Soviet defeat in 1989. A declassified Central Intelligence Agency report revealed that the Soviet elite routinely bribed its sons' way out of deployment to Afghanistan, or out of military service altogether.

In Russia, all men aged 18 through 30 are subject to the military draft, continuing the Soviet practice. According to a report from the European Parliamentary Research Service, an organ of the Secretariat of the European Parliament, in the mid-2010s fully half of the 150,000 young men called up each year were thought to be evading the draft. During Dmitry Medvedev's presidency, the service duration was reduced from two years to one.

==== Invasion of Ukraine ====
In September 2022, during the Russian invasion of Ukraine over 600,000 mobilization-eligible citizens left the country to avoid the draft. Reportedly, Georgia, Kazakhstan, and Mongolia became primary, visa-free destinations for Russians seeking to avoid President Vladimir Putin’s mobilization order. Finland, Poland and the Baltic countries announced they will not offer refuge to Russians fleeing mobilization.

In January 2023, Kazakhstan announced they were tightening visa rules, a move that is expected to make it more difficult for Russians to remain in the country. Kazakhstan said it would extradite Russians wanted for evading mobilization. In early 2023, the Biden administration resumed deportations of Russians who had fled Russia due to mobilization and political persecution. Kazakhstan and Kyrgyzstan agreed to share personal data of Russians fleeing mobilization.

=== South Korea ===
South Korea maintains mandatory military service. According to the Korea JoongAng Daily, since the early 2000s, the country has been rocked by scandals involving celebrities who try to use their fame to evade the draft or receive special treatment from the military. South Koreans are reportedly so hostile to draft evasion that one South Korean commentator said that it is "almost like suicide" for celebrities to engage in it. Yoo Seung-jun was one of the biggest stars on the South Korean rock scene until 2002, when he chose to evade the draft and become a U.S. citizen. South Korea subsequently deported him and banned him for life.

Some South Korean draft evaders have been sentenced to prison. In 2014, The Christian Science Monitor reported that South Korea had the "most draft dodgers in prison". The article, by veteran correspondent Donald Kirk, explained that South Korea's government did not allow for conscientious objection to war; as a result, 669 mostly religiously motivated South Koreans were said to be in jail for draft evasion in 2013. Only 723 draft evaders were said to be in jail worldwide at that time.

According to the South China Morning Post (Hong Kong), in June 2013 Lee Yeda became the first South Korean to be granted asylum specifically because he evaded the South Korean draft. His asylum claim was granted by France. "[In South] Korea, it is ... difficult to find a job for anyone who has not completed their national service," Lee was reported to have said. "Refusing to serve means that, in society, your life is terminated."

=== Syria ===
Syria requires men over 18 to serve in the army for two years (except for college graduates, who need serve only 18 months). Draft evasion carries stiff punishments, including fines and years of imprisonment. After the Syrian Civil War broke out in 2011, many draft-age men began fleeing the country, sometimes paying thousands of dollars to be smuggled out. Others paid to have their names expunged from the draft rolls. Meanwhile, the government erected billboards exhorting young people to join the army – and set up road checkpoints to capture draft evaders. By 2016, an estimated 70,000 draft evaders had left Syria, and others remained undetected within its borders.

Observers have identified several motives among the Syrian draft evaders. One is fear of dying in that country's civil war. Others include obeying parental wishes and disgust with the government of Bashar al-Assad. Thomas Spijkerboer, a professor of migration law at VU University Amsterdam, has argued that Syrian draft evaders motivated by a refusal to participate in violations of international law should be given refugee status by other nations.

In October 2018, the Syrian government announced an amnesty for draft evaders. However, an officer with Syria's "Reconciliation Ministry" told the Los Angeles Times that, while punishment would be canceled, military service would still be required. "Now the war is practically at its end, which means enlisting is no longer such a fearful situation", he said. "We expect we'll have very large numbers taking advantage of the amnesty".

=== Tunisia ===
Tunisia has had a draft since gaining its independence in 1956. Most males are required to submit documents to local officials at age 18 and to begin service two years later. However, according to the Lebanon-based Carnegie Middle East Center, the Tunisian draft has long been poorly enforced and draft evasion has long been rampant.

In order to minimize draft evasion, Tunisia began allowing young men to substitute "civilian" service (such as working on rural development projects) or "national" service (such as working as civil servants) for military service. But that has not helped: the defense minister reported that, in 2017, only 506 young men turned up out of an eligibility pool of more than 31,000.

=== Ukraine ===
In 2015, responding to perceived threats from pro-Russian rebels in eastern Ukraine, the Ukrainian military instituted a compulsory draft for males between 20 and 27 years of age. However, according to independent journalist Alec Luhn, writing in Foreign Policy magazine, a "huge number" of Ukrainians refused to serve. Luhn gives three reasons for this. One was fear of death. Another was that some young Ukrainians were opposed to war in general. A third was that some were unwilling to take up arms against those whom they perceived to be their countrymen.

The Ukrainian military itself has stated that, during a partial call-up in 2014, over 85,000 men failed to report to their draft offices, and nearly 10,000 of those were eventually declared to be illegal draft evaders.

After the Russian invasion of Ukraine, male Ukrainian nationals aged 18 to 60 were denied exit from Ukraine. Despite the ban on leaving Ukraine, an estimated 600,000–850,000 Ukrainian men fled to Europe after the Russian invasion. The Polish government offered, and the Lithuanian government considered, the repatriation of Ukrainian men living in their countries to Ukraine.

=== United States ===
The United States has employed a draft several times, usually during war but also during the Cold War. Each time the draft has been met with at least some resistance.

In Sketches of America (1818) British author Henry Bradshaw Fearon, who visited the young United States on a fact-finding mission to inform Britons considering emigration, described the New York Guard—although he did not name it—as he found it in New York City in August 1817:

Every male inhabitant can be called out, from the age of 18 to 45, on actual military duty. During a state of peace, there are seven musters annually: the fine for non-attendance is, each time, five dollars. Commanding officers have discretionary power to receive substitutes. An instance of their easiness to be pleased was related to me by Mr. —, a tradesman of this city. He never attends the muster, but, to avoid the fine, sends some of his men, who answer to his name; the same man is not invariably his deputy on parade: in this, Mr. — suits his own convenience; sometimes the collecting clerk, sometimes one of the brewers, at others a drayman: and to finish this military pantomime, a firelock is often dispensed with, for the more convenient wartime weapon—a cudgel. Courts-martial have the power of mitigating the fine, on the assignment of a satisfactory cause of absence, and in cases of poverty. Upon legal exemptions I cannot convey certain information. During a period of three months in the late war, martial law existed, and no substitutes were received. Aliens were not called out.

==== Civil War ====
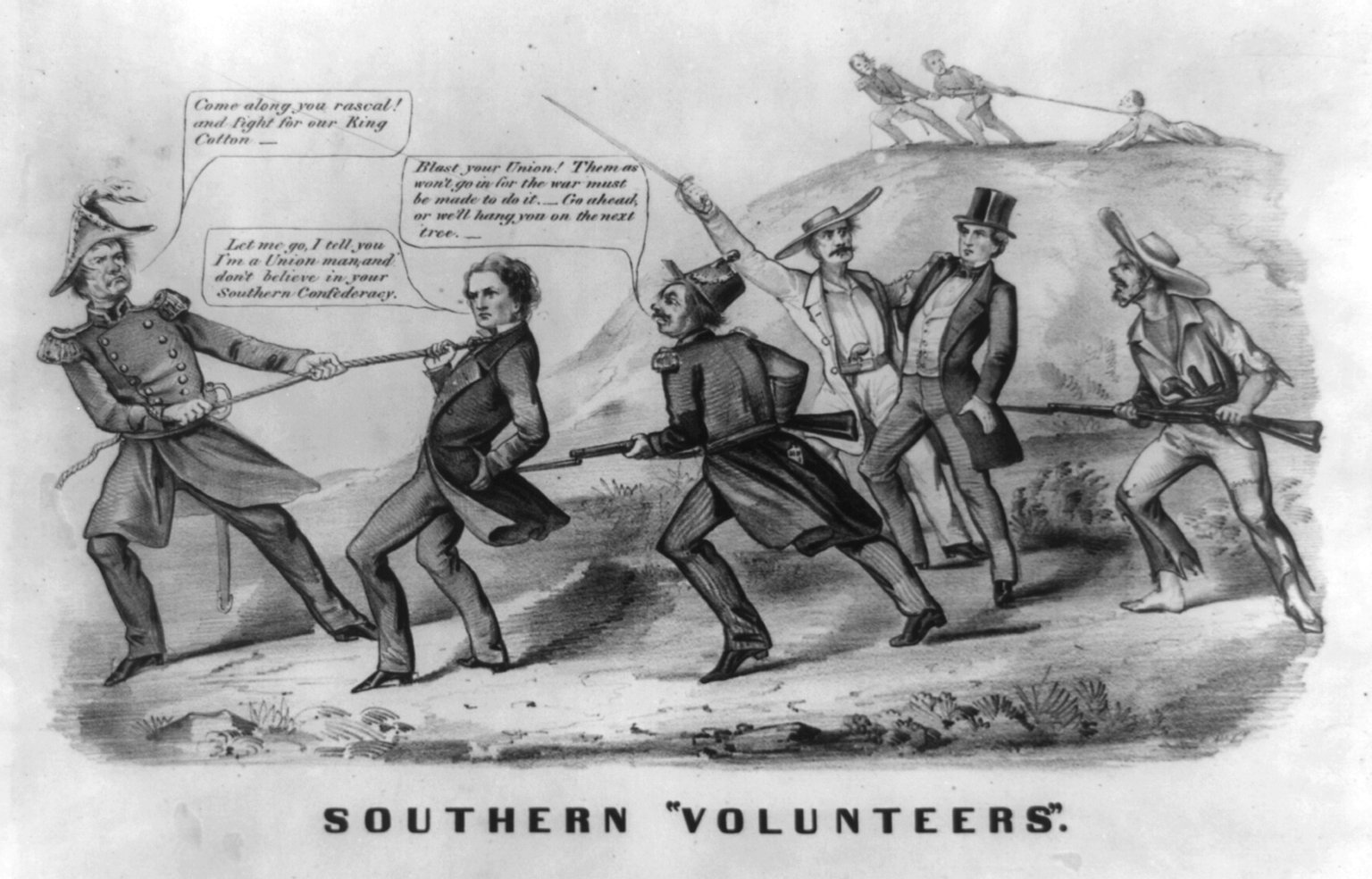
Parody of Confederate troops forcing a pro-Union Southerner (left foreground) and other reluctant Southerners to comply with the Confederate draft, c. 1862.

Both the Union (the North) and the Confederacy (the South) instituted drafts during the American Civil War – and both drafts were often evaded. In the North, evaders were most numerous among poor Irish immigrants. In the South, evaders were most numerous in hill country and in certain other parts of Texas, Louisiana, and Georgia.

Resistance to the draft was sometimes violent. In the North, nearly 100 draft enrollment officers were injured in attacks. Anti-draft riots in New York City in 1863 lasted several days and resulted in up to 120 deaths and 2,000 injuries.

According to historian David Williams, by 1864 the Southern draft had become virtually unenforceable. Some believe that draft evasion in the South, where manpower was scarcer than in the North, contributed to the Confederate defeat.

==== World War I ====
The Selective Service Act of 1917 was carefully drawn to remedy the defects in the Civil War system by allowing exemptions for dependency, essential occupations, and religious scruples and by prohibiting all forms of bounties, substitutions, or purchase of exemptions. In 1917 and 1918 some 24 million men were registered and nearly 3 million inducted into the military services, with little of the overt resistance that characterized the Civil War.

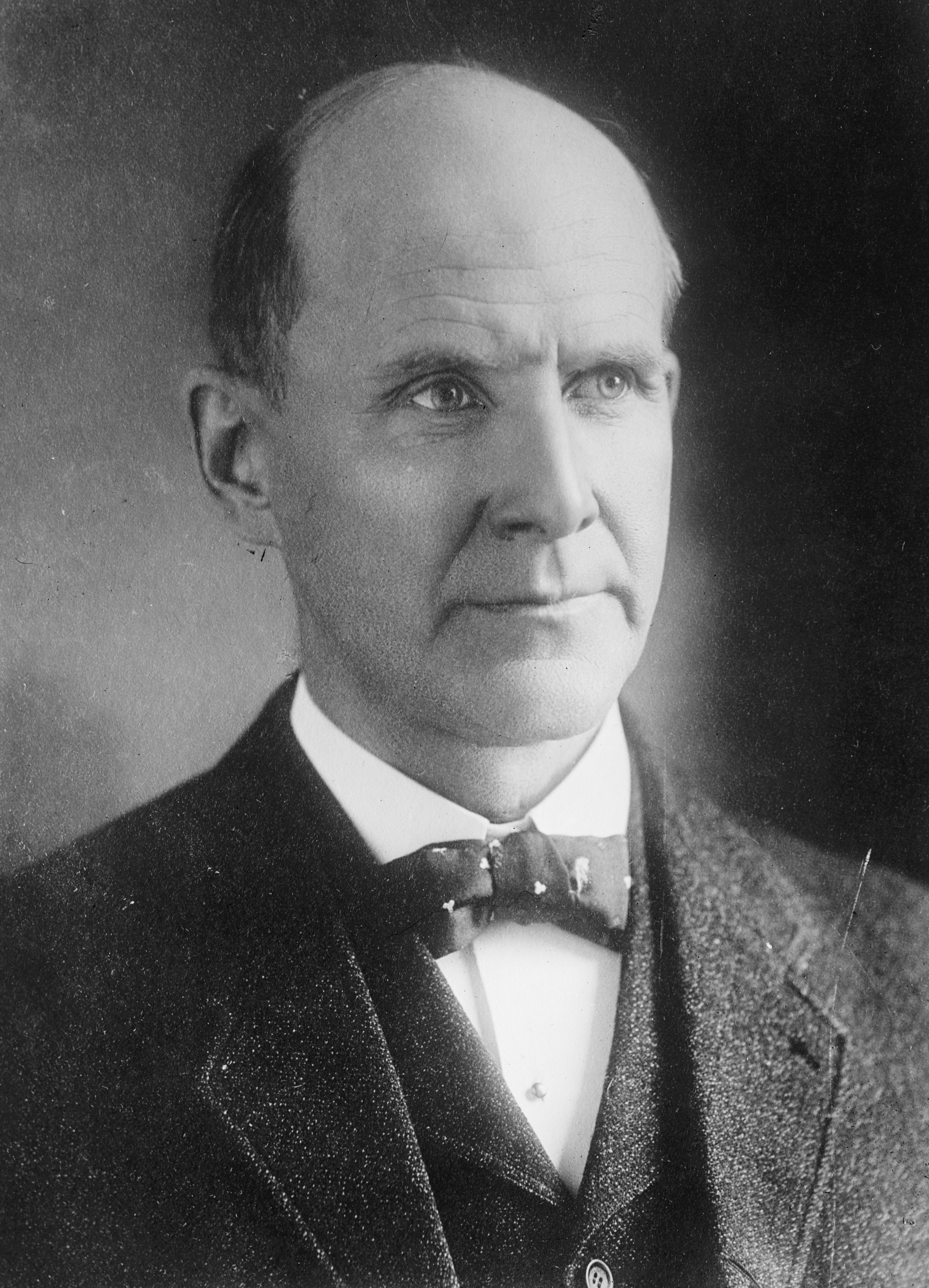
Eugene V. Debs spoke out against the draft during World War I.

In the United States during World War I, the word "slacker" was commonly used to describe someone who was not participating in the war effort, especially someone who avoided military service, an equivalent of the later term "draft dodger." Attempts to track down such evaders were called "slacker raids." Under the Espionage Act of 1917, activists including Eugene V. Debs and Emma Goldman were arrested for speaking out against the draft.

Despite such circumstances, draft evasion was substantial. According to one scholar, nearly 11 percent of the draft-eligible population refused to register, or to report for induction; according to another, 12 percent of draftees either failed to report to their training camps or deserted from them. A significant amount of draft evasion took place in the South, in part because many impoverished Southerners lacked documentation and in part because many Southerners recalled the "horrible carnage" of the Civil War. In 2017, historian Michael Kazin concluded that a greater percentage of American men evaded the draft during World War I than during the Vietnam War.

==== World War II ====
According to scholar Anna Wittmann, about 72,000 young Americans applied for conscientious objector (CO) status during World War II, and many of their applications were rejected. Some COs chose to serve as noncombatants in the military, others chose jail, and a third group – taking a position in between – chose to enter a specially organized domestic Civilian Public Service.

==== Korean War ====
The Korean War, which lasted from 1950 to 1953, generated 80,000 cases of alleged draft evasion.

==== Vietnam War ====
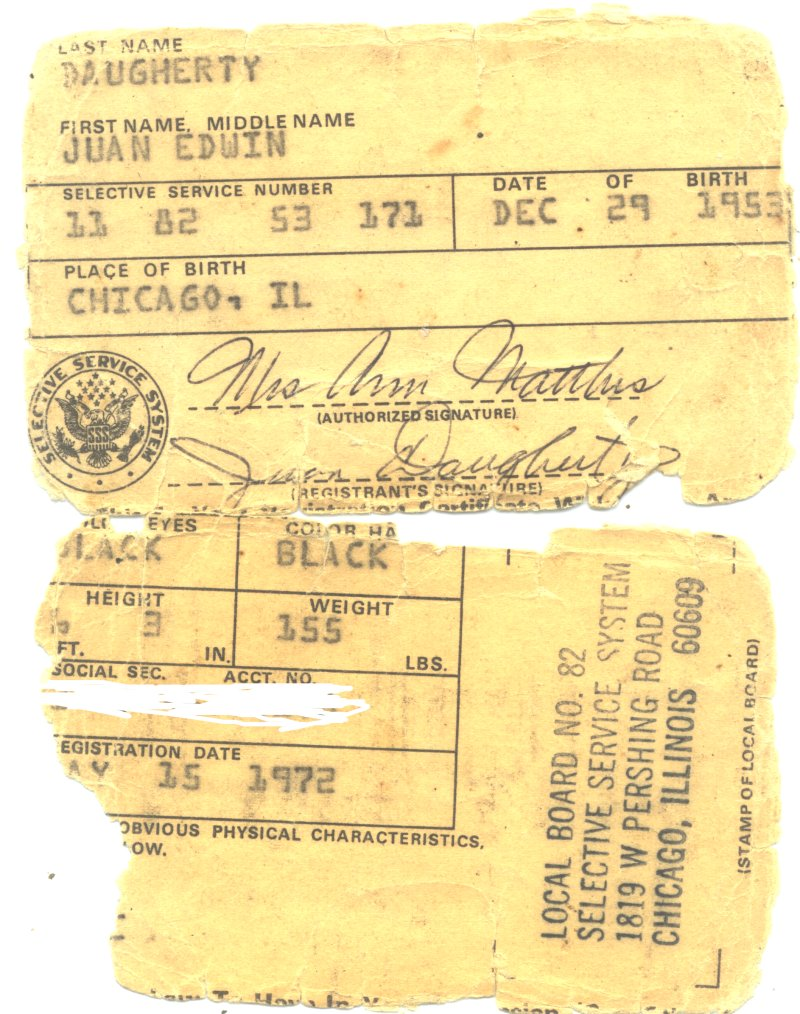
A Vietnam War-era draft card. Retention of the card was legally required.

Draft card burning in New York City, 1967

The Vietnam War (1955–1975) was controversial in the US and was accompanied by a significant amount of draft evasion among young Americans, with many managing to remain in the U.S. by various means and some eventually leaving for Canada or elsewhere.

===== Avoidance and resistance at home =====
Significant draft avoidance was taking place even before the US became heavily involved in the Vietnam War. The large cohort of Baby Boomers allowed for a steep increase in the number of exemptions and deferments, especially for college and graduate students. According to peace studies scholar David Cortright, "more than half" of the 27 million men eligible for the draft during the Vietnam War were deferred, exempted, or disqualified.

The number of draft resisters was also significant. According to Cortright, "Distinct from the millions who [avoided] the draft were the many thousands who resisted the conscription system and actively opposed the war". The head of US President Richard Nixon's task force on the all-volunteer military reported in 1970 that the number of resisters was "expanding at an alarming rate" and that the government was "almost powerless to apprehend and prosecute them". It is now known that, during the Vietnam era, approximately 570,000 young men were classified as draft offenders, and approximately 210,000 were formally accused of draft violations; however, only 8,750 were convicted and only 3,250 were jailed. Some draft eligible men publicly burned their draft cards, but the Justice Department brought charges against only 50, of whom 40 were convicted.

As US troop strength in Vietnam increased, some young men sought to evade the draft by pro-actively enlisting in military forces that were unlikely to see combat in Vietnam. For example, conscription scholars Lawrence Baskir and William Strauss say that the Coast Guard may have served that purpose for some, though they also point out that Coast Guardsmen had to maintain readiness for combat in Vietnam, and that some Coast Guardsmen eventually served and were killed there. Similarly, the Vietnam-era National Guard was seen by some as an avenue for avoiding combat in Vietnam, although that too was less than foolproof: about 15,000 National Guardsmen were sent to Vietnam before the war began winding down.

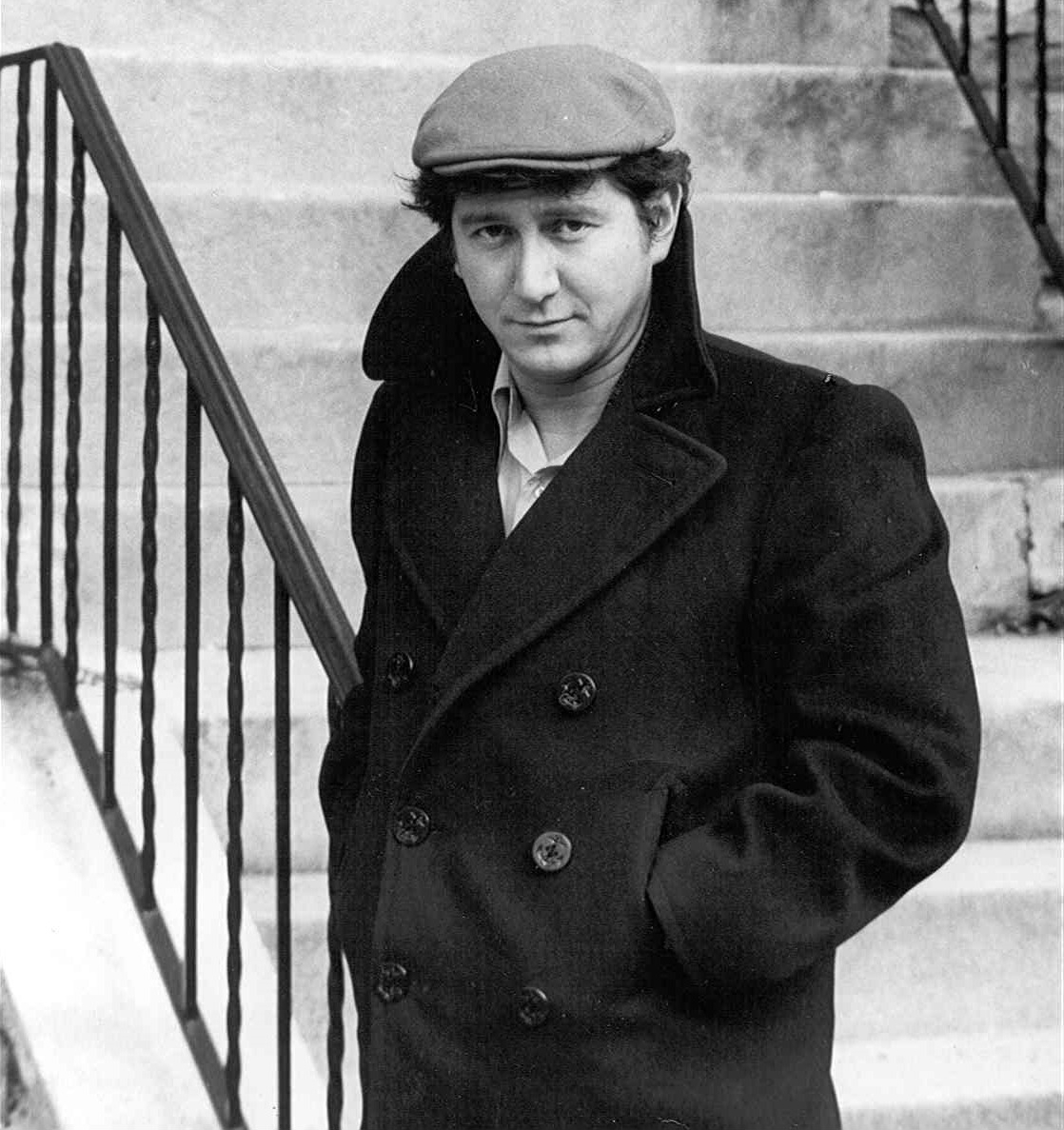
Phil Ochs (1940–1976) was one of several countercultural figures to encourage draft evasion.

Other young men sought to evade the draft by avoiding or resisting any military commitment. In this they were bolstered by certain countercultural figures. "Draft Dodger Rag", a 1965 song by Phil Ochs, employed satire to provide a how-to list of available deferments: ruptured spleen, poor eyesight, flat feet, asthma, and many more. Folksinger Arlo Guthrie lampooned the paradox of seeking a deferment by acting crazy in his song "Alice's Restaurant": "I said, 'I wanna kill! Kill! Eat dead burnt bodies!' and the Sergeant said, 'You're our boy'!" The book 1001 Ways to Beat the Draft was co-authored by Tuli Kupferberg, a member of the band The Fugs. It espoused such methods as arriving at the draft board in diapers. Another text pertinent to draft-age men was Jules Feiffer's cartoon novella from the 1950s, Munro, later a short film, in which a four-year-old boy is drafted by mistake.

Draft counseling groups were another source of support for potential draft evaders. Many such groups were active during the war. Some were connected to national groups, such as the American Friends Service Committee and Students for a Democratic Society; others were ad hoc campus or community groups. Many specially trained individuals worked as counselors for such groups.

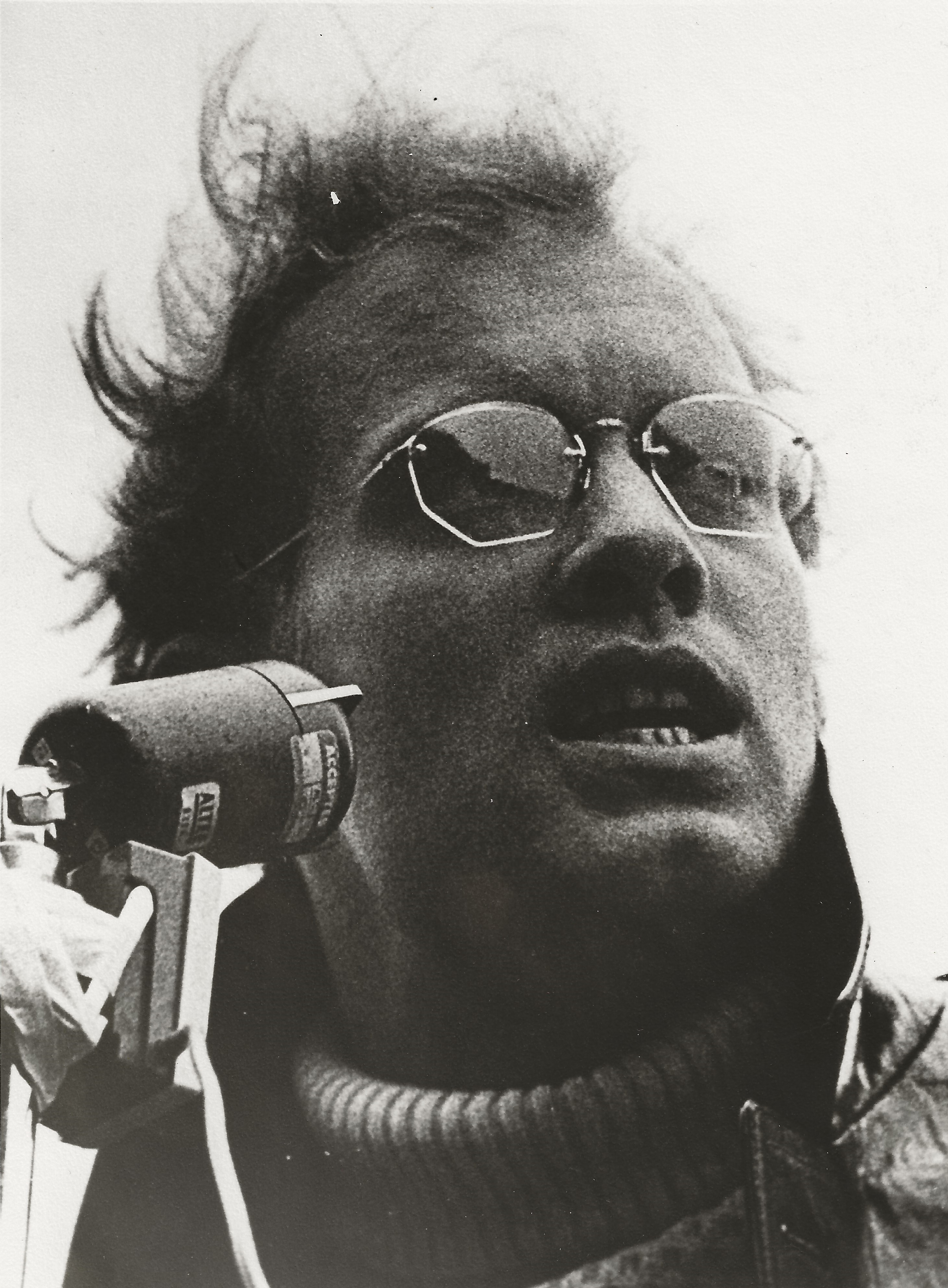
David Harris and "The Resistance" helped organize Stop the Draft Week in Oakland, California, October 1967.

Alongside the draft counseling groups, a substantial draft resistance movement emerged. Students for a Democratic Society sought to play a major role in it, as did the War Resisters League, the Student Nonviolent Coordinating Committee's "National Black Anti-War Anti-Draft Union" and other groups. Many say that the draft resistance movement was spearheaded by an organization called The Resistance. It was founded by David Harris and others in the San Francisco Bay Area in March 1967, and quickly spread nationally. The insignia of the organization was the Greek letter omega, Ω, the symbol for ohms—the unit of electrical resistance. Members of The Resistance publicly burned their draft cards or refused to register for the draft. Other members deposited their cards into boxes on selected dates and then mailed them to the government. They were then drafted, refused to be inducted, and fought their cases in the federal courts. These draft resisters hoped that their public civil disobedience would help to bring the war and the draft to an end. Many young men went to federal prison as part of this movement. According to Cortright, the draft resistance movement was the leading edge of the anti-war movement in 1967 and 1968.

After the war, some of the draft evaders who stayed in the U.S. wrote memoirs. These included David Harris's Dreams Die Hard (1982), David Miller's I Didn't Know God Made Honky Tonk Communists (2001), Jerry Elmer's Felon for Peace (2005), and Bruce Dancis's Resister (2014). Harris was an anti-draft organizer who went to jail for his beliefs (and was briefly married to folk singer Joan Baez), Miller was the first Vietnam War refuser to publicly burn his draft card (and later became partner to spiritual teacher Starhawk), Elmer refused to register for the draft and destroyed draft board files in several locations, and Dancis led the largest chapter of Students for a Democratic Society (the one at Cornell University) before being jailed for publicly shredding his draft card and returning it to his draft board. Harris in particular expresses serious second thoughts about aspects of the movement he was part of.

===== Emigration to Canada and elsewhere =====
Canadian historian Jessica Squires emphasizes that the number of U.S. draft evaders coming to Canada was "only a fraction" of those who resisted the Vietnam War. According to a 1978 book by former members of President Gerald Ford's Clemency Board, 210,000 Americans were accused of draft offenses and 30,000 left the country. More recently, Cortright estimated that 60,000 to 100,000 left the US, mainly for Canada or Sweden. Others scattered elsewhere; for example, historian Frank Kusch mentions Mexico, scholar Anna Wittmann mentions Britain, and journalist Jan Wong describes one draft evader who sympathized with Mao Zedong's China and found refuge there. Draft evader Ken Kiask spent eight years traveling continuously across the Global South before returning to the US

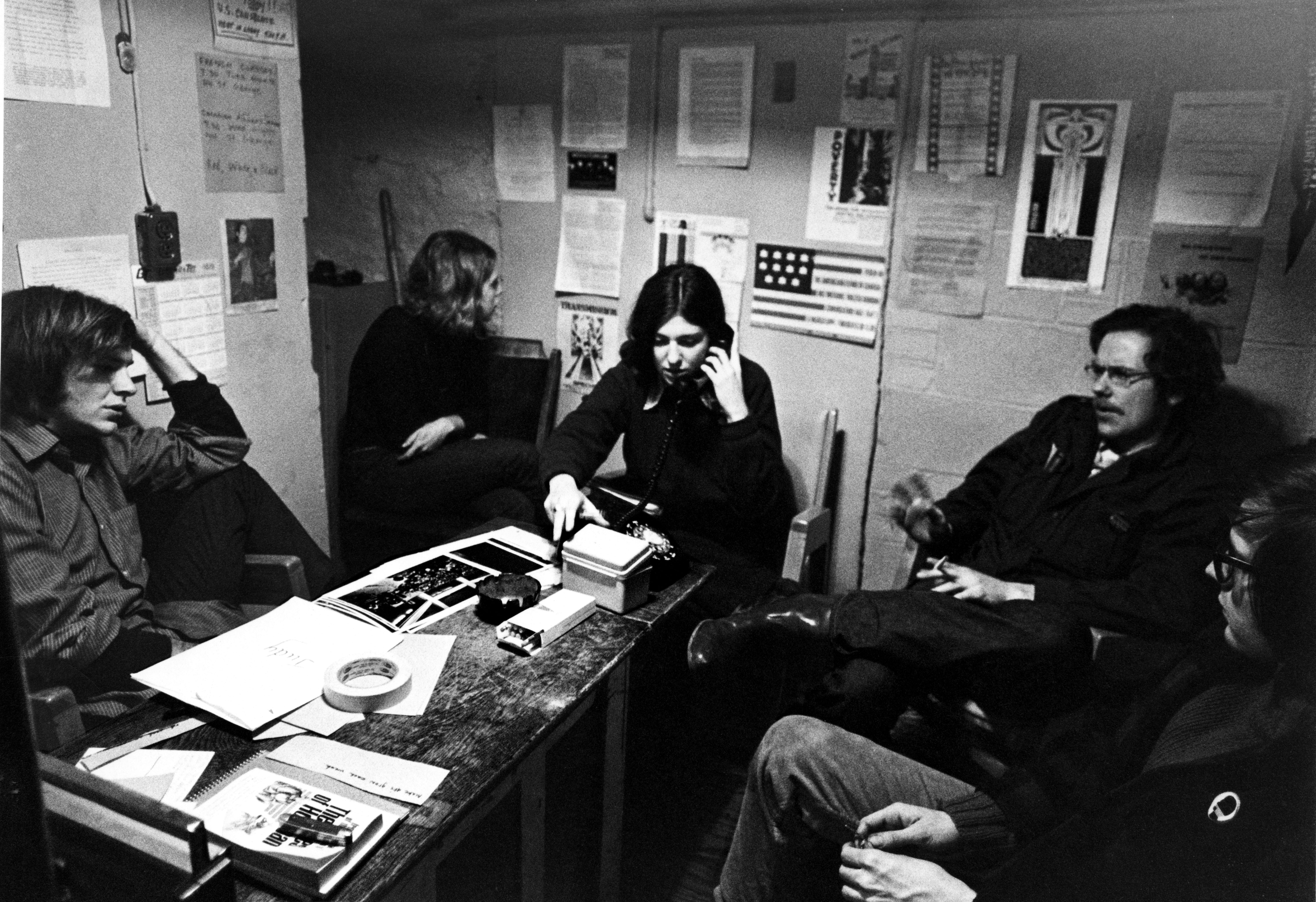
Mark Satin (left), director of the Toronto Anti-Draft Programme, counseling American draft evaders, 1967

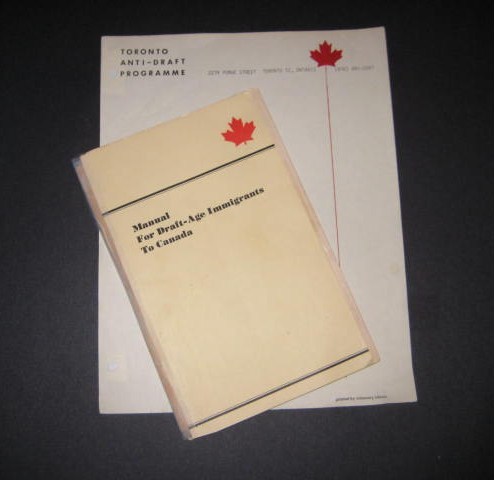
Tattered copy of the Manual for Draft-Age Immigrants to Canada (1968) atop Anti-Draft Programme stationery

The number of Vietnam-era draft evaders leaving for Canada is hotly contested; an entire book, by scholar Joseph Jones, has been written on that subject. In 2017, University of Toronto professor Robert McGill cited estimates by four scholars, including Jones, ranging from a floor of 30,000 to a ceiling of 100,000, depending in part on who is being counted as a draft evader. In 2025, a major article about Vietnam-era draft evaders in Canada's conservative National Post newspaper put the number at 50,000.

Though the presence of U.S. draft evaders and deserters in Canada was initially controversial, the Canadian government eventually chose to welcome them. Draft evasion was not a criminal offense under Canadian law. The issue of deserters was more complex. Desertion from the US military was not on the list of crimes for which a person could be extradited under the extradition treaty between Canada and the US; however, desertion was a crime in Canada, and the Canadian military strongly opposed condoning it. In the end, the Canadian government maintained the right to prosecute these deserters, but in practice left them alone and instructed border guards not to ask questions relating to the issue.

In Canada, many American Vietnam War evaders received pre-emigration counseling and post-emigration assistance from locally based groups. Typically these consisted of American emigrants and Canadian supporters. The largest were the Montreal Council to Aid War Resisters, the Toronto Anti-Draft Programme, and the Vancouver Committee to Aid American War Objectors. Journalists often noted their effectiveness. The Manual for Draft-Age Immigrants to Canada, published jointly by the Toronto Anti-Draft Programme and the House of Anansi Press, sold nearly 100,000 copies, and one sociologist found that the Manual had been read by over 55% of his data sample of US Vietnam War emigrants either before or after they arrived in Canada. In addition to the counseling groups (and at least formally separate from them) was a Toronto-based political organization, the Union of American Exiles, better known as "Amex." It sought to speak for American draft evaders and deserters in Canada. For example, it lobbied and campaigned for universal, unconditional amnesty, and hosted an international conference in 1974 opposing anything short of that.

Those who went abroad faced imprisonment or forced military service if they returned home. In September 1974, President Gerald Ford offered an amnesty program for draft dodgers that required them to work in alternative service occupations for periods of six to 24 months. In 1977, one day after his inauguration, President Jimmy Carter fulfilled a campaign promise by offering pardons to anyone who had evaded the draft and requested one. It antagonized critics on both sides, with the right complaining that those pardoned paid no penalty and the left complaining that requesting a pardon required the admission of a crime.

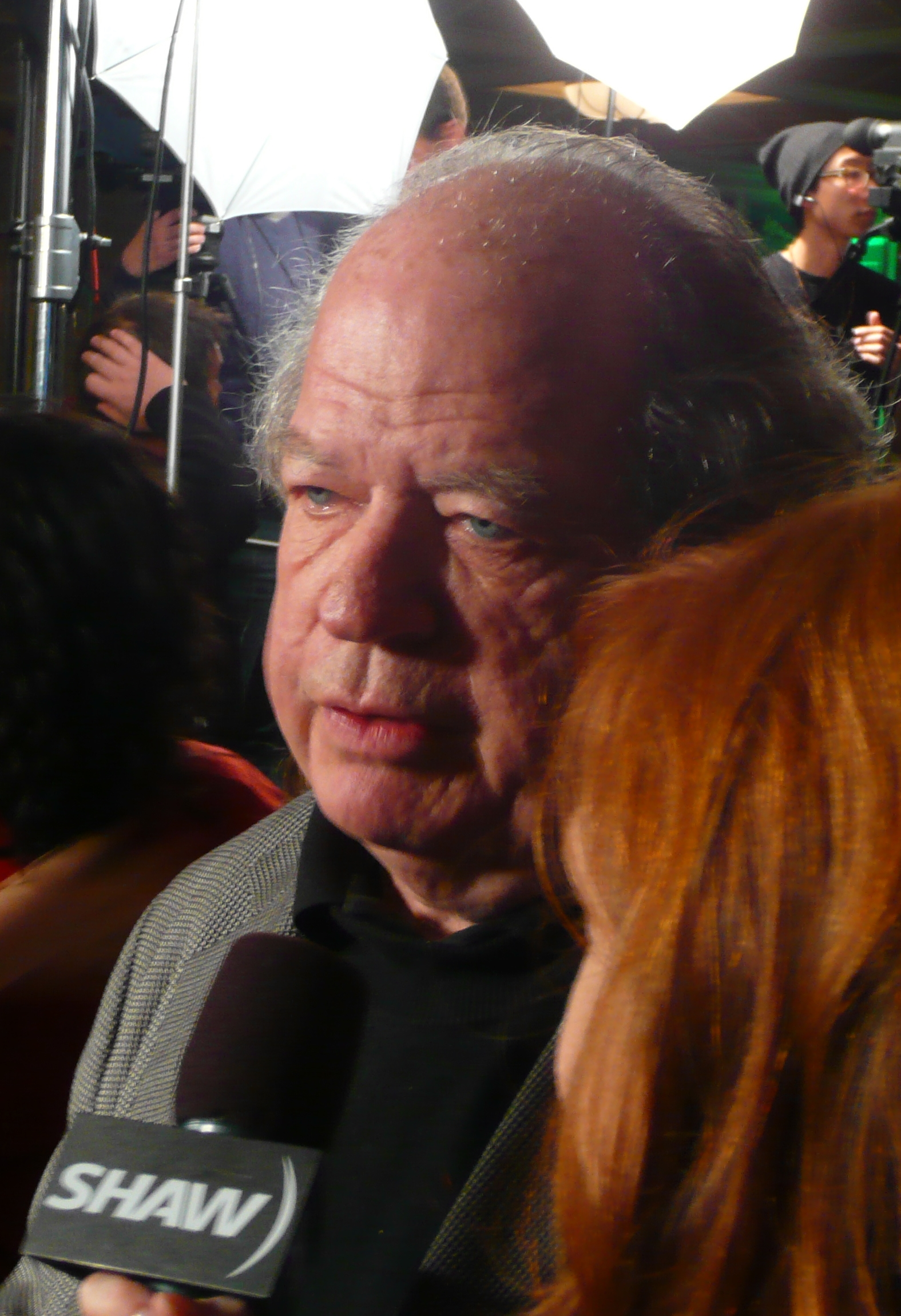
Vancouver city councillor Jim Green was one of several draft evaders who became prominent in Canada.

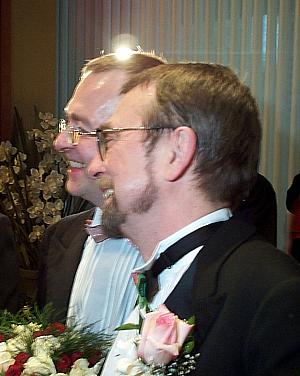
Gay rights advocate Michael Hendricks (right) is another draft evader who affected Canadian life.

It remains a matter of debate whether emigration to Canada and elsewhere during the Vietnam War was an effective, or even a genuine, war resistance strategy. Scholar Michael Foley argues that it was not only relatively ineffective, but that it served to siphon off disaffected young Americans from the larger struggle. Activists Rennie Davis and Tom Hayden reportedly held similar views. By contrast, authors John Hagan and Roger N. Williams recognize the American emigrants as "war resisters" in the subtitles of their books about the emigrants, and Manual for Draft-Age Immigrants to Canada author Mark Satin contended that public awareness of tens of thousands of young Americans leaving for Canada would – and eventually did – help end the war.

Some draft evaders returned to the U.S. from Canada after the 1977 pardon, but according to sociologist John Hagan, about half of them stayed on. This young and mostly educated population expanded Canada's arts and academic scenes, and helped push Canadian politics further to the left, though some Canadians, including some principled nationalists, found their presence or impact troubling. American draft evaders who left for Canada and became prominent there include author William Gibson, politician Jim Green, gay rights advocate Michael Hendricks, attorney Jeffry House, author Keith Maillard, playwright John Murrell, television personality Eric Nagler, film critic Jay Scott, and musician Jesse Winchester. Other draft evaders from the Vietnam era remain in Sweden and elsewhere.

Two academic literary critics have written at length about autobiographical novels by draft evaders who went to Canada – Rachel Adams in the Yale Journal of Criticism and Robert McGill in a book from McGill-Queen's University Press. Both critics discuss Morton Redner's Getting Out (1971) and Mark Satin's Confessions of a Young Exile (1976), and Adams also discusses Allen Morgan's Dropping Out in 3/4 Time (1972) and Daniel Peters's Border Crossing (1978). All these books portray their protagonists' views, motives, activities, and relationships in detail. Adams says they contain some surprises:

It is to be expected that the draft dodgers denounce the state as an oppressive bureaucracy, using the vernacular of the time to rail against "the machine" and "the system." What is more surprising is their general resistance to mass movements, a sentiment that contradicts the association of the draft dodger with sixties protest found in more recent work by [Scott] Turow or [Mordecai] Richler. In contrast to stereotypes, the draft dodger in these narratives is neither an unthinking follower of movement ideology nor a radical who attempts to convert others to his cause. ... [Another surprise is that the dodgers] have little interest in romantic love. Their libidinal hyperactivity accords with [Herbert] Marcuse's belief in the liberatory power of eros. They are far less worried about whether particular relationships will survive the flight to Canada than about the gratification of their immediate sexual urges.

Later memoirs by Vietnam-era draft evaders who went to Canada include Donald Simons's I Refuse (1992), George Fetherling's Travels by Night (1994), and Mark Frutkin's Erratic North (2008).

===== Prominent people arguably manipulating the system =====
For decades after the Vietnam War ended, prominent Americans were being accused of having manipulated the draft system to their advantage.

According to a column by E. J. Dionne in The Washington Post, by 2006 politicians whom opponents had accused of improperly avoiding the draft included George W. Bush, Dick Cheney, and Bill Clinton.

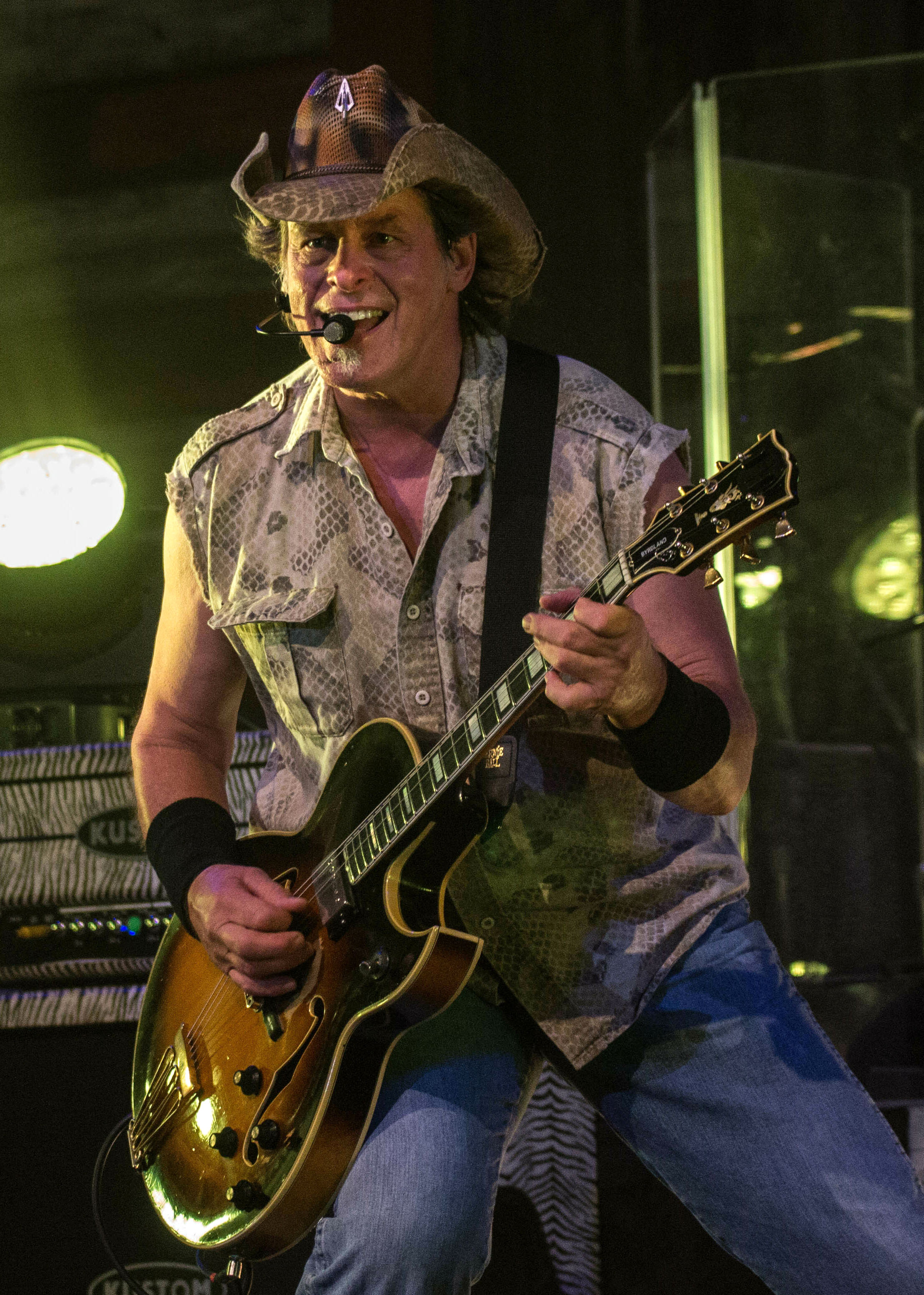
Ted Nugent reportedly took extreme measures to avoid the draft.

In a 1970s High Times article, American singer-songwriter Ted Nugent stated that he took crystal meth, and urinated and defecated in his pants before his physical, in order to avoid being drafted into the Vietnam War. In a 1990 interview with a large Detroit newspaper, Nugent made similar statements.

Actor and comedian Chevy Chase also misled his draft board. In 1989, approximately two decades after the fact, Chase revealed on a television talk show that he avoided the Vietnam War by making several false claims to his draft board, including that he harbored homosexual tendencies. He added he was "not very proud" of having done that. Several politically charged books subsequently discussed Chase's behavior.

Radio talk show host Rush Limbaugh reportedly avoided the Vietnam draft because of anal cysts. In a 2011 book critical of Limbaugh, journalist John K. Wilson accused Limbaugh making "hyperbolic attacks on foreign policy".

Former Republican presidential nominee Mitt Romney's deferment has been questioned. During the Vietnam War, The Church of Jesus Christ of Latter-day Saints (LDS Church) – Romney's church – became embroiled in controversy for deferring large numbers of its young members." The LDS Church eventually agreed to cap the number of missionary deferments it sought for members in any one region. After Romney dropped out of Stanford University and was about to lose his student deferment, he decided to become a missionary; and the LDS Church in his home state of Michigan chose to give him one of that state's missionary deferments. In a Salon article from 2007, journalist Joe Conason noted that Romney's father had been governor of Michigan at the time.

Attention has also been paid to independent Senator Bernie Sanders's failure to serve. In an article in The Atlantic, it was reported that, after graduating from the University of Chicago in 1964, and moving back to New York City, the future candidate for the Democratic Presidential nomination applied for conscientious objector status – even though as Sanders acknowledged to the reporter, he was not religious. (Sanders was opposed to the Vietnam War. At the time, however, CO status was granted entirely on the basis of religious opposition to all war.) Sanders's CO status was denied. Nevertheless, a "lengthy series of hearings, an FBI investigation and numerous postponements and delays" took him to age 26 at which point he was no longer eligible for the draft. In a 2015 book critical of Sanders, journalist Harry Jaffe revisited that portion of the Atlantic article, emphasizing that by the time Sanders's "numerous hearings" had run their course he was "too old to be drafted".

U.S. president Donald Trump graduated from college in the spring of 1968, and became eligible for military service. Trump however, due to a personal friend of his father's, a medical doctor, was granted a diagnosis of bone spurs in his heels. The diagnosis allowed Trump to receive a medical deferment.

===== Pardons =====
In 1977, President Jimmy Carter issued a pardon giving unconditional amnesty to Vietnam war draft resisters.

== Larger issues ==
"[T]he aggregation of thousands upon thousands of ... 'petty' acts of resistance [can] have dramatic economic and political effects. ... Poaching and squatting on a large scale can restructure the control of property. Peasant tax evasion on a large scale has brought about crises of appropriation that threaten the state. Massive desertion by serf or peasant conscripts has helped bring down more than one ancient regime. Under the appropriate conditions, the accumulation of petty acts can, rather like snowflakes on a steep mountainside, set off an avalanche".

— Political scientist James C. Scott, 1990.

The phenomenon of draft evasion has raised several major issues among scholars and others.

=== Effectiveness ===
One issue is the effectiveness of the various kinds of draft evasion practices with regard to ending a military draft or stopping a war. Historian Michael S. Foley sees many draft evasion practices as merely personally beneficial. In his view, only public anti-draft activity, consciously and collectively engaged in, is relevant to stopping a draft or a war. By contrast, sociologist Todd Gitlin is more generous in his assessment of the effectiveness of the entire gamut of draft evasion practices. Political scientist James C. Scott, although speaking more theoretically, makes a similar point, arguing that the accumulation of thousands upon thousands of "petty" and obscure acts of private resistance can trigger political change.

=== Gender ===
In countries with male-only draft the draft evasion can be seen as evading discrimination against men.

=== Social class ===
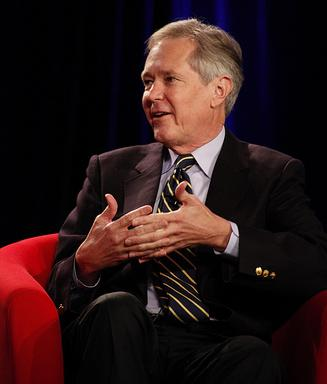
Harvard graduate James Fallows wrote about the shame he felt as a draft evader.

Another issue is how best to understand young people's responses to a military call-up. According to historian Charles DeBenedetti, some Vietnam War opponents chose to evaluate people's responses to the war largely in terms of their willingness to take personal responsibility to resist evil, a standard prompted by the Nuremberg doctrine. The Manual for Draft-Age Immigrants to Canada urged its readers to make their draft decision with Nuremberg in mind. By contrast, prominent journalist James Fallows is convinced that social class (rather than conscience or political conviction) was the dominant factor in determining who would fight in the war and who would evade their obligation to do so. Fallows writes of the shame he felt – and continued to feel – after he realized that his successful attempt at draft evasion (he brought his body weight below the minimum, and lied about his mental health), an attempt he prepared for with the help of sophisticated draft counselors and classmates at Harvard, meant that working-class kids from Boston would be going to Vietnam in his stead. He referred to this outcome as a matter of class discrimination and passionately argued against it. Fallows indicated that he might have felt differently about his behavior had he chosen public draft resistance, jail, or exile.

Historian Stanley Karnow has noted that, during the Vietnam War, student deferments themselves helped preserve class privilege: "[President Lyndon] Johnson generously deferred U.S. college students from the draft to avoid alienating the American middle class".

=== Democracy ===
Historian Howard Zinn and political activist Tom Hayden saw at least some kinds of draft evasion as a positive expression of democracy. By contrast, historian and classical studies scholar Mathew R. Christ says that, in ancient democratic Athens, where draft evasion was ongoing, many of the popular tragic playwrights were deeply concerned about the corrosive effects of draft evasion on democracy and community. According to Christ, while many of these playwrights were sensitive to the moral dilemmas of war and the imperfections of Athenian democracy, most touted "the ethical imperative that a man should support his friends and community. In serving the community, the individual does ... what is right and honorable".

== See also ==
- Australian Freedom League – opposed conscription in Australia during World War I
- Canada and the Vietnam War – includes discussion of U.S. draft evaders
- Central Committee for Conscientious Objectors – provided information and counseling to U.S. war resisters and draft evaders from 1948 to 2011
- Desertion – discusses military desertion generally and in several individual nations
- End Conscription Campaign – opposed conscription of white South Africans in Apartheid-era South Africa
- No-Conscription Fellowship – opposed British conscription during World War I
- No Conscription League – co-founded by Emma Goldman in response to the U.S. draft during World War I
- Pardon – legal relief sometimes offered to draft evaders
- Peace churches – A number of Christian denominations historically and presently opposed to war and the draft
- Refusal to serve in the Israel Defense Forces (IDF) - Overview of resistance by Israelis to participate in mandatory military service for the IDF
- War resister – discusses variety of types of war refusers, including draft refusers
