= Draft evasion in the Vietnam War =

U.S. and Australian social phenomenon from 1964 to 1973

- Part of Opposition to the Vietnam War
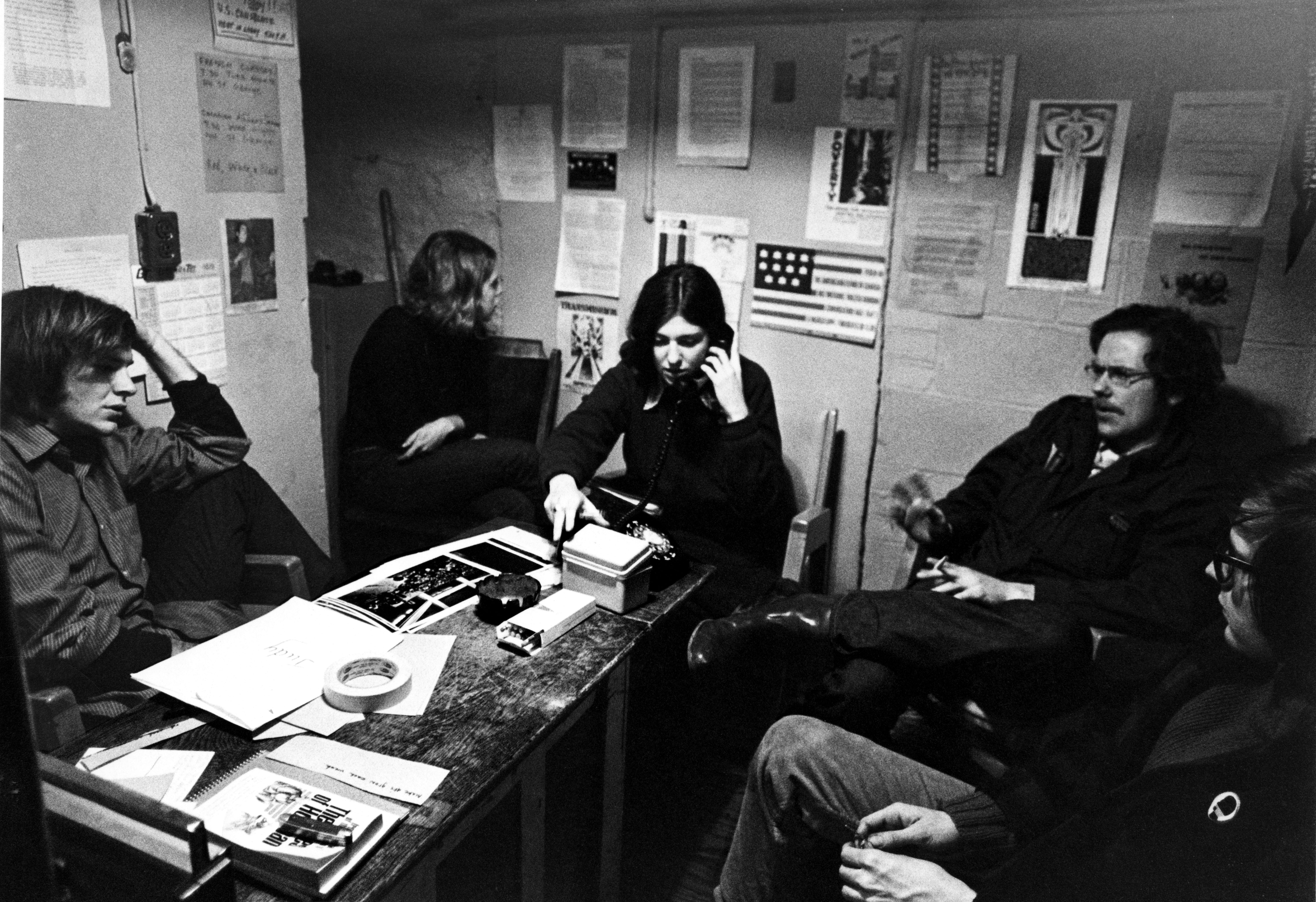
- Five young people sitting and talking intently, Mark Satin (left), director of the Toronto Anti-Draft Programme, counseling American draft evaders, 1967
- Date: 1965–1973
- Location: United States; Australia
- Caused by: Conscription in Australia; Conscription in the United States
- Goals: Avoid military deployment in the Vietnam War
- Methods: Immigrating to Canada or Sweden; Attempting deferment; Conscientious objection; Draft-card burning; Enlisting in the United States Coast Guard or the United States National Guard
- Result: General: Disruption -- and eventual termination -- of the draft (military conscription).; Lowered military personnel; Specifics: More than half of 27,000,000 available men deferred from the draft; 60,000–100,000 men emigrate from the United States

Draft evasion in the Vietnam War was a common practice in the United States and Australia during the conflict. Significant draft avoidance was taking place even before the United States became heavily involved in the Vietnam War. The large cohort of Baby Boomers and late Silent Generationers allowed for a steep increase in the number of exemptions and deferments, especially for college and graduate students. More than half of the 27 million men eligible for the draft during the Vietnam War were deferred, exempted or disqualified.

== Evasion in Australia ==
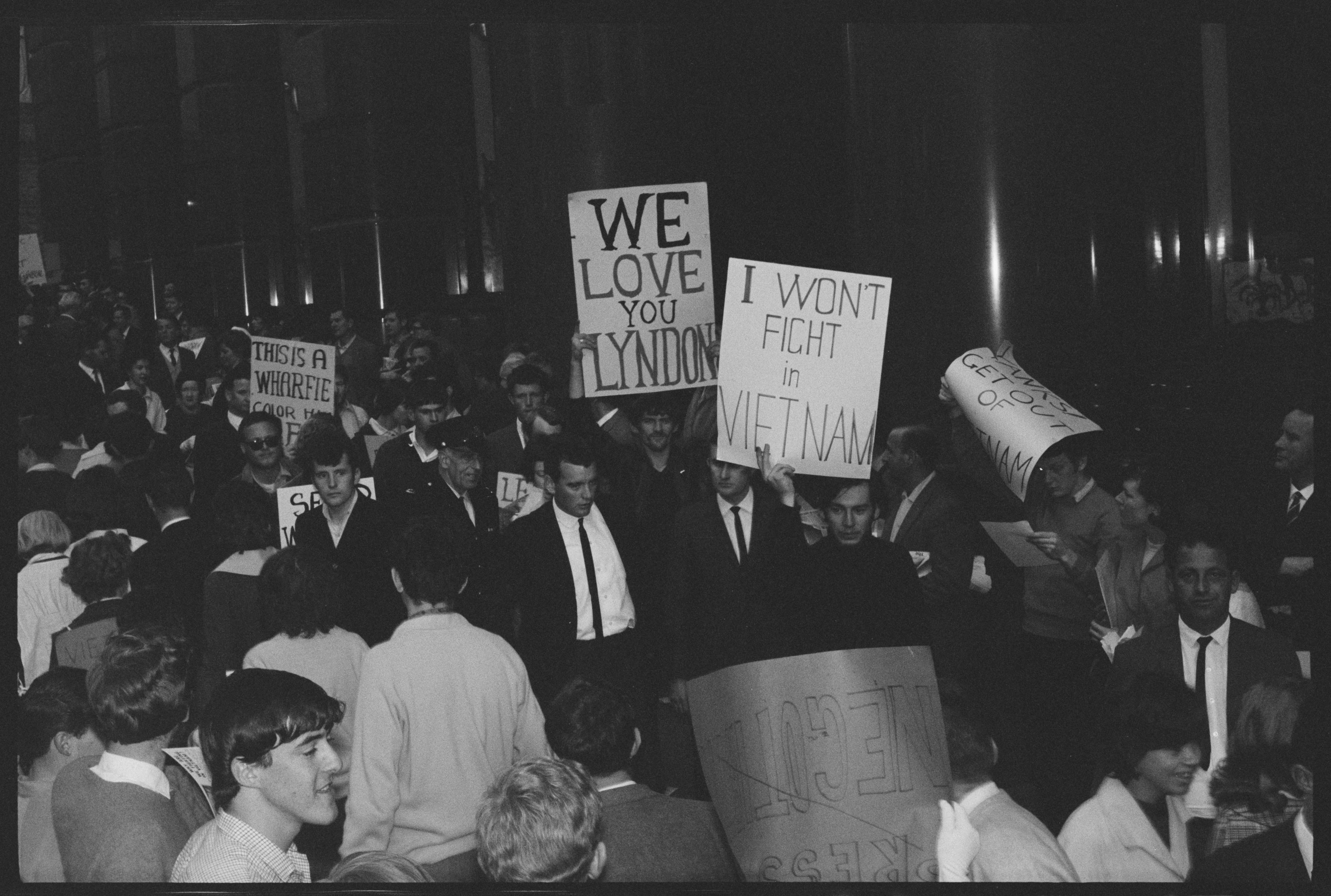
Anti-Vietnam War demonstration in Sydney, 1965

Australia reintroduced compulsory military training via the National Service Act 1964, with conscripted soldiers deployed to Vietnam by the Holt government from 1966. From 1966 to 1968 a growing force of conscientious objectors grew in Australia and by 1967 became openly popular due to a growing protest movement. Information campaigns were carried out by organizations like Students for a Democratic Society and Save Our Sons to spread information on how to avoid the draft.

Young men who were subject to the conscription lottery also formed their own anti-conscription organisation, the Youth Campaign Against Conscription. It was the YCAC that imported the concept of draft-card burning from the United States and ushered in a new form of resistance to conscription, active non-compliance. Instead of merely not registering (passive non-compliance with the National Service Scheme), the young conscripts actively demonstrated their distaste for the government's actions by destroying their registration cards.

Conscription ended in December 1972, and the remaining seven men in Australian prisons for refusing conscription were freed in mid-to-late December 1972. 63,735 national servicemen served in the Army, of whom 15,381 were deployed to Vietnam. Approximately 200 were killed.

== Evasion in the United States ==
=== Penalties and rate of prosecution ===
A distinction is made between draft evaders and draft resisters. There were millions of men who avoided the draft, and many thousands who openly resisted the conscription system and actively opposed the war. The head of U.S. President Richard Nixon's task force on the all-volunteer military reported in 1970 that the number of resisters was "expanding at an alarming rate" and that the government was "almost powerless to apprehend and prosecute them". It is now known that, during the Vietnam era, approximately 570,000 young men were classified as draft offenders, and approximately 210,000 were formally accused of draft violations; however, only 8,750 were convicted and only 3,250 were jailed. Some draft eligible men publicly burned their draft cards, but the Justice Department brought charges against only 50, of whom 40 were convicted.

=== Enlisting to evade ===
As U.S. troop strength in Vietnam increased, some young men sought to evade the draft by preemptively enlisting in military forces that were unlikely to see combat in Vietnam, such as the Coast Guard, though Coast Guardsmen had to maintain readiness for combat in Vietnam, and some Coast Guardsmen eventually served and were killed there. Similarly, the Vietnam-era National Guard was seen by some as an avenue for avoiding combat in Vietnam, although that too was less than foolproof: about 15,000 National Guardsmen were sent to Vietnam before the war began winding down.

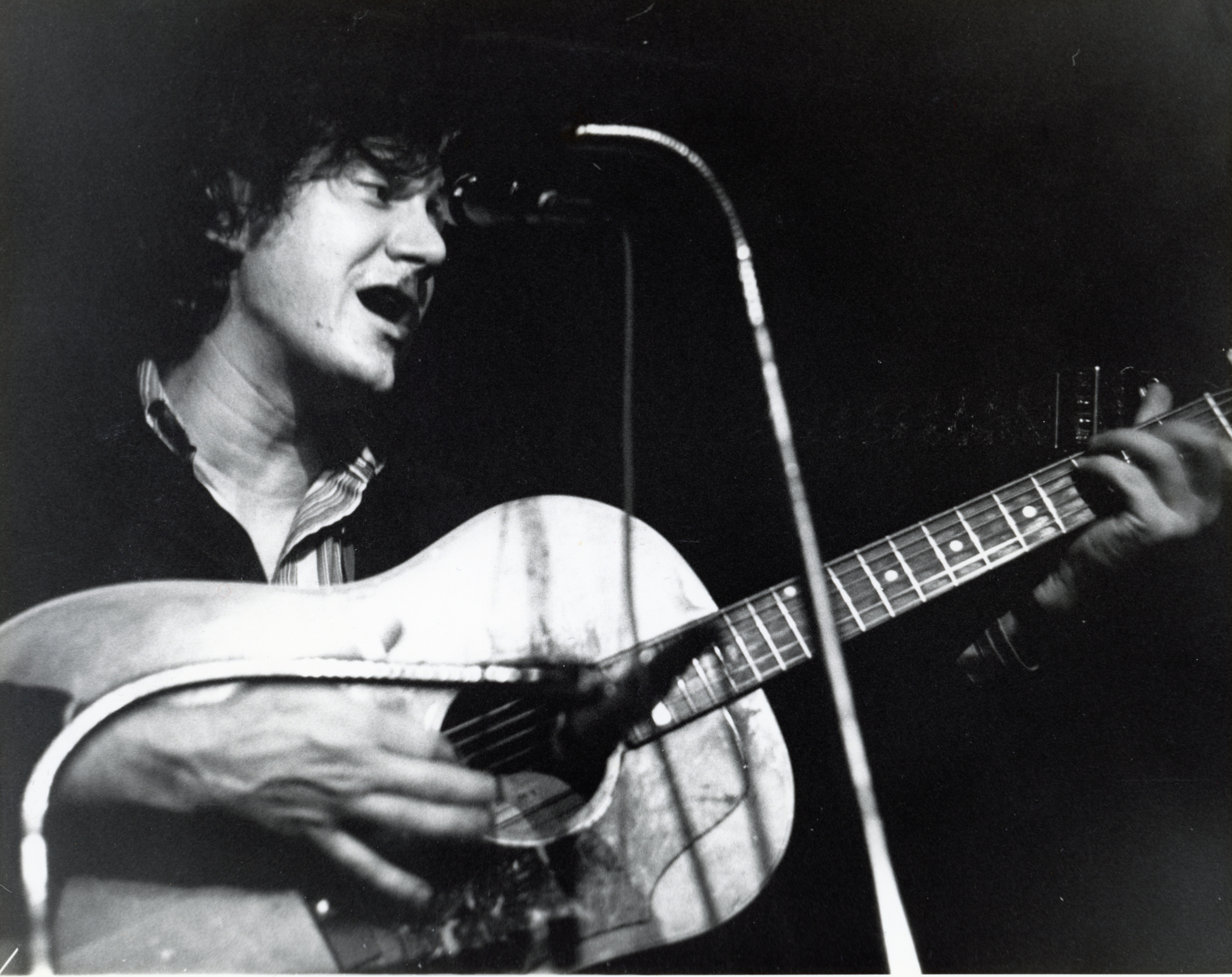
Phil Ochs (1940–1976) was one of several countercultural figures to encourage draft evasion.

=== Evasion counseling ===
Other young men sought to evade the draft by avoiding or resisting any military commitment. In this they were bolstered by certain countercultural figures. "Draft Dodger Rag", a 1965 song by Phil Ochs, circumvented laws against counseling evasion by employing satire to provide a how-to list of available deferments: ruptured spleen, poor eyesight, flat feet, asthma, and many more. Folksinger Arlo Guthrie lampooned the paradox of seeking a deferment by acting crazy in his song "Alice's Restaurant": "I said, 'I wanna kill! Kill! Eat dead burnt bodies!' and the Sergeant said, 'You're our boy'!" The book 1001 Ways to Beat the Draft was co-authored by Tuli Kupferberg, a member of the band The Fugs. It espoused such methods as arriving at the draft board in diapers. Another text pertinent to draft-age men was Jules Feiffer's cartoon novella from the 1950s, Munro, later a short film, in which a four-year-old boy is drafted by mistake.

Draft counseling groups were another source of support for potential draft evaders. Many such groups were active during the war. Some were connected to national groups, such as the American Friends Service Committee and Students for a Democratic Society; others were ad hoc campus or community groups. Many specially trained individuals worked as counselors for such groups.

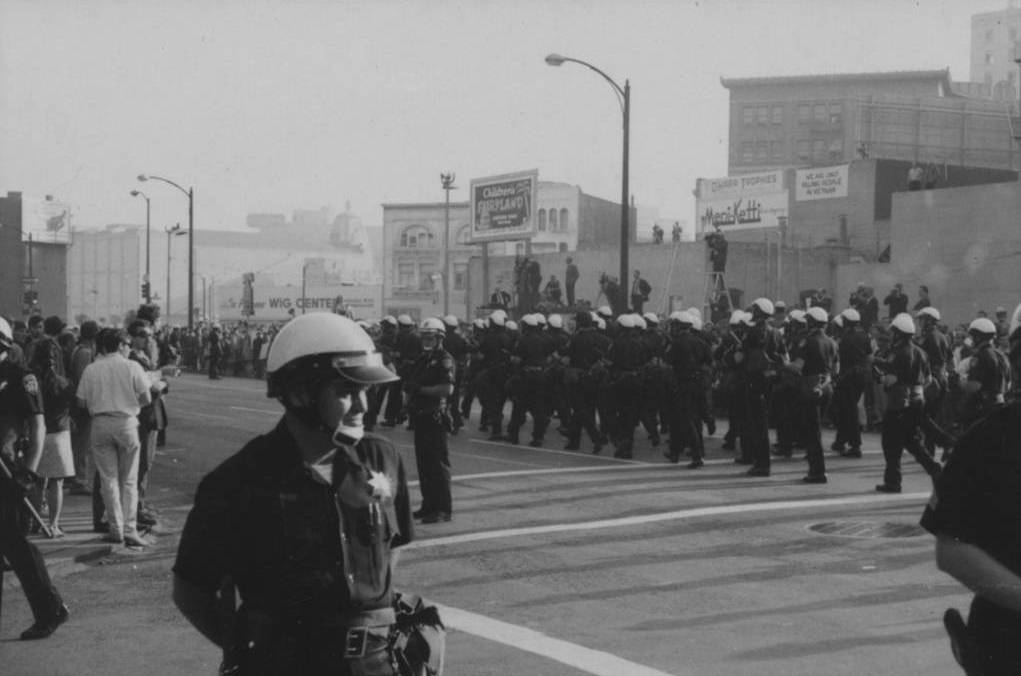
David Harris and "The Resistance" helped organize Stop the Draft Week in Oakland, California, October 1967.

=== Public resistance ===
Alongside the draft counseling groups, a substantial draft resistance movement emerged. Although draft resistance is sometimes discussed as a form of "draft evasion", draft resisters and scholars of draft resistance reject the categorization of resistance as a form of evasion or avoidance. Draft resisters argue that they seek to confront, not evade or avoid, the draft. Students for a Democratic Society sought to play a major role in it, as did the War Resisters League, the Student Nonviolent Coordinating Committee's "National Black Anti-War Anti-Draft Union" and other groups. Many say that the draft resistance movement was spearheaded by an organization called The Resistance. It was founded by David Harris and others in the San Francisco Bay Area in March 1967, and quickly spread nationally. The insignia of the organization was the Greek letter omega, Ω, the symbol for ohms—the unit of electrical resistance. Some members of The Resistance publicly burned their draft cards or refused to register for the draft. Other members deposited their cards into boxes on selected dates and then mailed them to the government. They were then drafted, refused to be inducted, and fought their cases in the federal courts. These draft resisters hoped that their public civil disobedience would help to bring the war and the draft to an end. Many young men went to federal prison as part of this movement. According to Cortright, the draft resistance movement was the leading edge of the anti-war movement in 1967 and 1968.

301 Draft Resistance groups have been identified by the Mapping American Social Movements Project. By far the largest number were in California where they spread up and down the state in college towns and big cities from Chico to San Diego. The eastern college corridor from Boston to Baltimore was also active as were campuses and cities in Michigan, Ohio, Illinois, and Wisconsin.

After the war, some of the draft resisters who stayed in the U.S. wrote memoirs. These included David Harris's Dreams Die Hard (1982), David Miller's I Didn't Know God Made Honky Tonk Communists (2001), Jerry Elmer's Felon for Peace (2005), and Bruce Dancis's Resister (2014). Harris was an anti-draft organizer who went to jail for his beliefs (and was briefly married to folk singer Joan Baez), Miller was the first Vietnam War refuser to publicly burn his draft card (and later became partner to spiritual teacher Starhawk), Elmer refused to register for the draft and destroyed draft board files in several locations, and Dancis led the largest chapter of Students for a Democratic Society (the one at Cornell University) before being jailed for publicly shredding his draft card and returning it to his draft board. Harris in particular expresses serious second thoughts about aspects of the movement he was part of.

== American emigration to Canada and elsewhere ==
=== Popularity ===
The number of U.S. draft evaders who went to Canada was a fraction of those who resisted the Vietnam War. According to a 1978 book by former members of President Gerald Ford's Clemency Board, 210,000 Americans were accused of draft offenses and 30,000 left the country. A recent estimate is that 60,000 to 100,000 left the U.S., mainly for Canada or Sweden. Others scattered elsewhere; Mexico, Britain, and at least one draft evader sympathized with Mao Zedong's China and found refuge there. Draft evader Ken Kiask spent eight years traveling continuously across the Global South before returning to the U.S.

The number of Vietnam-era draft evaders leaving for Canada is hotly contested. Estimates range from a floor of 30,000 to a ceiling of 100,000, depending in part on who is being counted as a draft evader. Despite longtime speculation that most American Vietnam War soldiers were draftees, it was revealed in later years that the vast majority of these soldiers were in fact volunteers.

=== Process of emigration ===
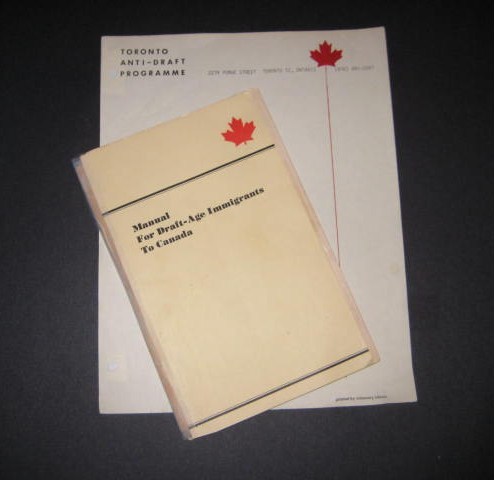
Tattered copy of the Manual for Draft-Age Immigrants to Canada (1968) atop Anti-Draft Programme stationery.

Though the presence of U.S. draft evaders and deserters in Canada was initially controversial, the Canadian government eventually chose to welcome them. Draft evasion was not a criminal offense under Canadian law. The issue of deserters was more complex. Desertion from the U.S. military was not on the list of crimes for which a person could be extradited under the extradition treaty between Canada and the U.S.; however, desertion was a crime in Canada, and the Canadian military strongly opposed condoning it. In the end, the Canadian government maintained the right to prosecute these deserters, but in practice left them alone and instructed border guards not to ask questions relating to the issue.

In Canada, many American Vietnam War evaders received pre-emigration counseling and post-emigration assistance from locally based groups. Typically these consisted of American emigrants and Canadian supporters. The largest were the Montreal Council to Aid War Resisters, the Toronto Anti-Draft Programme, and the Vancouver Committee to Aid American War Objectors. Journalists often noted their effectiveness. The Manual for Draft-Age Immigrants to Canada, published jointly by the Toronto Anti-Draft Programme and the House of Anansi Press, sold nearly 100,000 copies, and one sociologist found that the Manual had been read by over 55% of his data sample of U.S. Vietnam War emigrants either before or after they arrived in Canada. In addition to the counseling groups (and at least formally separate from them) was a Toronto-based political organization, the Union of American Exiles, better known as "Amex." It sought to speak for American draft evaders and deserters in Canada. For example, it lobbied and campaigned for universal, unconditional amnesty, and hosted an international conference in 1974 opposing anything short of that.

=== Conditional Amnesty and Pardons ===
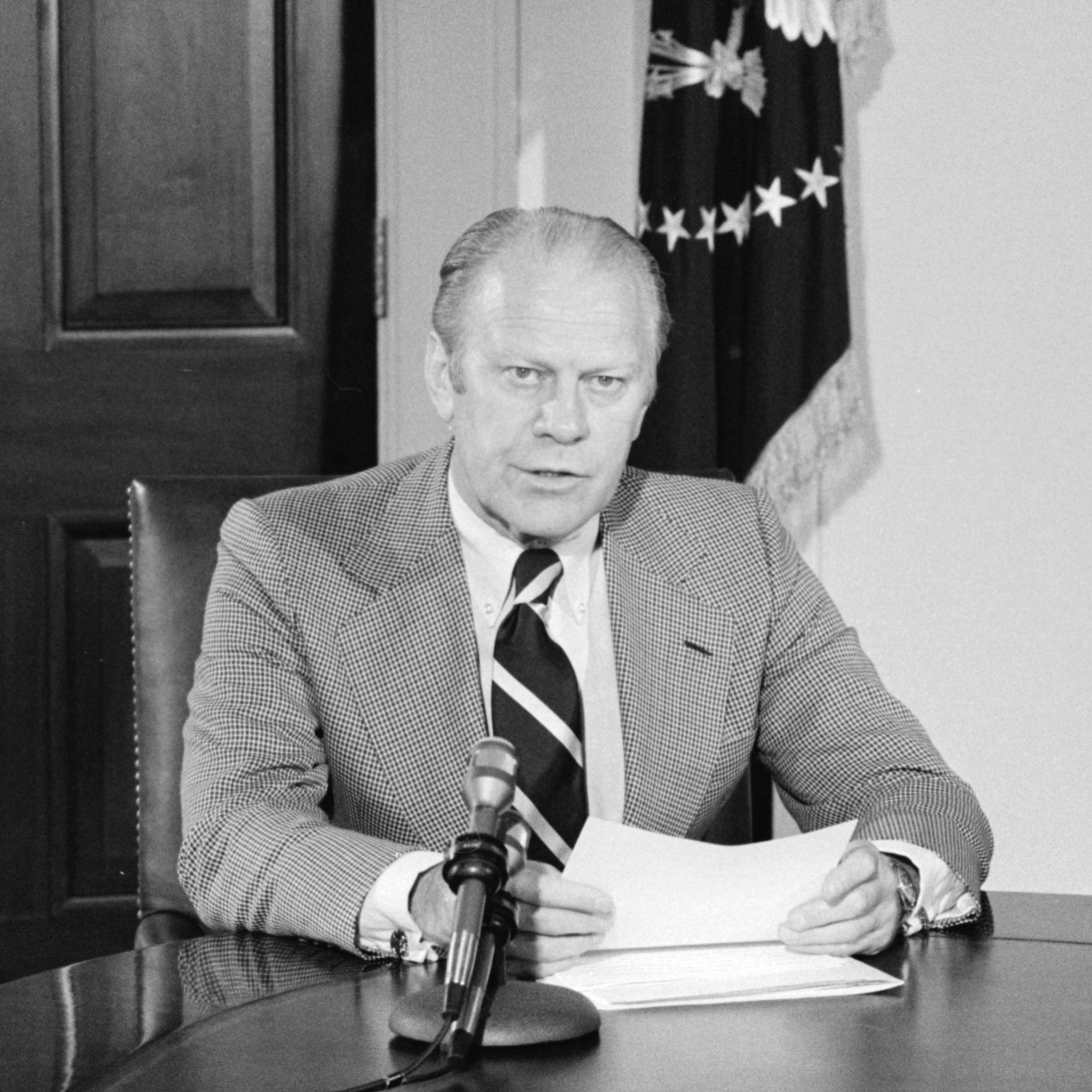
President Gerald Ford announcing from the White House that draft evaders would be given an amnesty program in 1974.

Those who went abroad faced imprisonment or forced military service if they returned home.

In September 1974, President Gerald R. Ford offered a conditional amnesty program for draft dodgers that required them to work in alternative service occupations for periods of six to 24 months. At the same time, an offer of prison-release was made to resisters who had remained in the U.S. and had been imprisoned for the offense. But the offers were not popular with either affected group, and did not have a large uptake. Many resented the conditions for "refusing to fight what they called an immoral war". And for evaders who by then had established lives and even had families abroad, the program had tight deadlines to apply, which could make it impractical to pursue. After two extensions, the program expired on March 31, 1975, with only 19% of those potentially eligible for it accepting its terms.

Then in 1977, one day after his inauguration, President Jimmy Carter fulfilled a campaign promise by offering unconditional pardons to anyone who had evaded the draft and requested one. It antagonized critics on both sides, with the right complaining that those pardoned paid no penalty and the left complaining that accepting a pardon required the admission of a crime. In April 1977, Carter extended the pardon to deserters, allowing them to apply for an upgrade of their less-than-honorable or general discharge status.

=== Effects of emigration ===
It remains a matter of debate whether emigration to Canada and elsewhere during the Vietnam War was an effective, or even a genuine war resistance strategy. Scholars argue that it was relatively ineffective, and that it served to siphon off disaffected young Americans from the anti-war movement. Activists Rennie Davis and Tom Hayden reportedly held similar views. By contrast, others recognize the American emigrants as "war resisters", and Manual for Draft-Age Immigrants to Canada author Mark Satin contended that public awareness of tens of thousands of young Americans leaving for Canada would – and eventually did – help end the war.

Some draft evaders returned to the U.S. from Canada after the 1977 pardon, but about half of them stayed on. This young and mostly educated population expanded Canada's arts and academic scenes, and helped push Canadian politics further to the left, though some Canadians, including some nationalists, found their presence or impact troubling. American draft evaders who left for Canada and became prominent there include politician Jim Green, gay rights advocate Michael Hendricks, attorney Jeffry House, author Keith Maillard, playwright John Murrell, television personality Eric Nagler, film critic Jay Scott, and musician Jesse Winchester. Other draft evaders from the Vietnam era remain in Sweden and elsewhere.

=== Experiences of emigrants ===
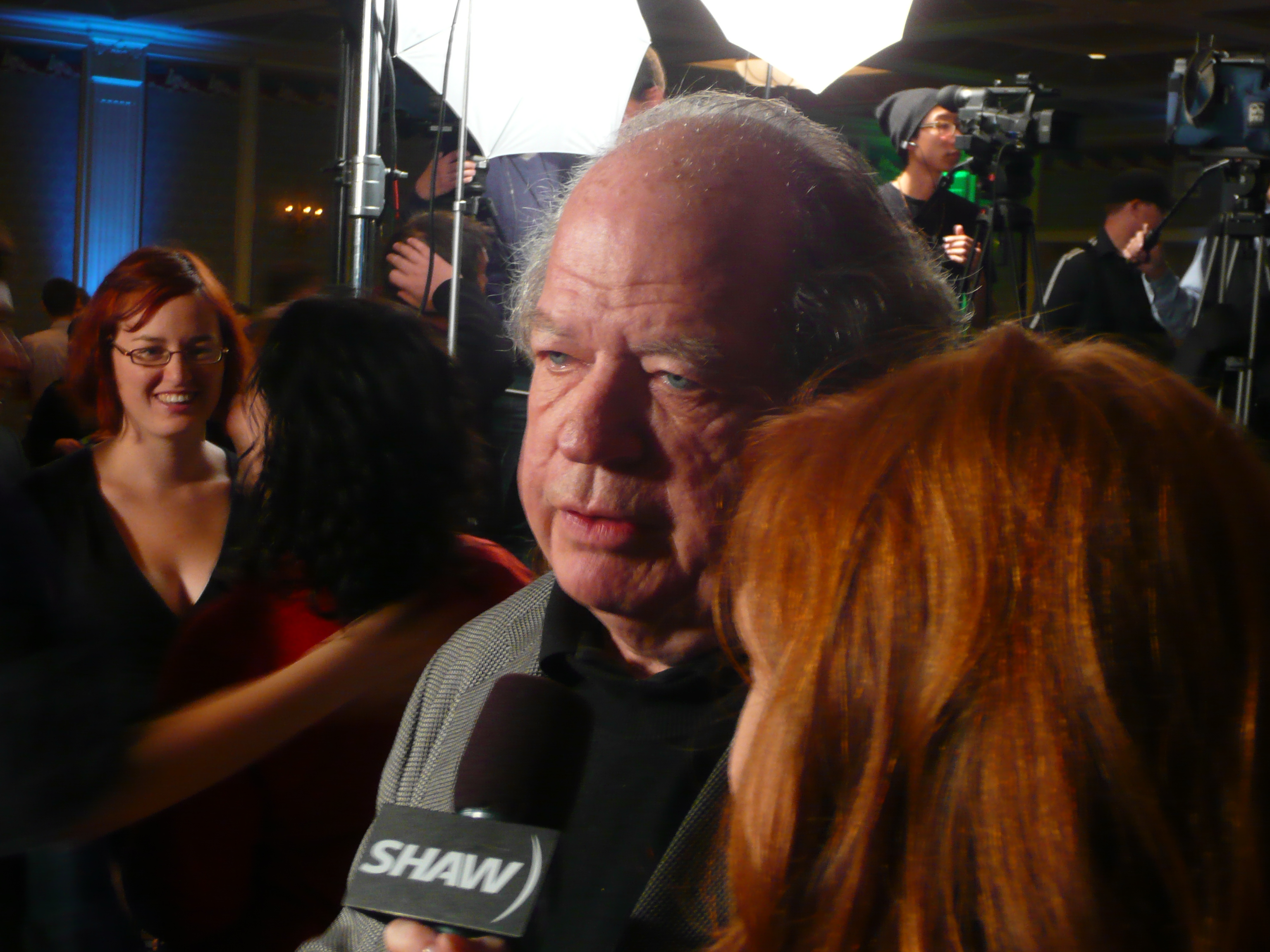
Vancouver city councillor Jim Green was one of several draft evaders who later settled in Canada and became prominent in Canadian politics.

A number of autobiographical novels were written by draft evaders who went to Canada Books such as Morton Redner's Getting Out (1971) and Mark Satin's Confessions of a Young Exile (1976), Allen Morgan's Dropping Out in 3/4 Time (1972), and Daniel Peters's Border Crossing (1978) all portrayed their protagonists' views, motives, activities, and relationships in detail. A critic noted that they contained some surprises:

It is to be expected that the draft dodgers denounce the state as an oppressive bureaucracy, using the vernacular of the time to rail against "the machine" and "the system." What is more surprising is their general resistance to mass movements, a sentiment that contradicts the association of the draft dodger with sixties protest found in more recent work by [Scott] Turow or [Mordecai] Richler. In contrast to stereotypes, the draft dodger in these narratives is neither an unthinking follower of movement ideology nor a radical who attempts to convert others to his cause. ... [Another surprise is that the dodgers] have little interest in romantic love. Their libidinal hyperactivity accords with [Herbert] Marcuse's belief in the liberatory power of eros. They are far less worried about whether particular relationships will survive the flight to Canada than about the gratification of their immediate sexual urges.

Later memoirs by Vietnam-era draft evaders who went to Canada include Donald Simons's I Refuse (1992), George Fetherling's Travels by Night (1994), and Mark Frutkin's Erratic North (2008).

== Legacy ==
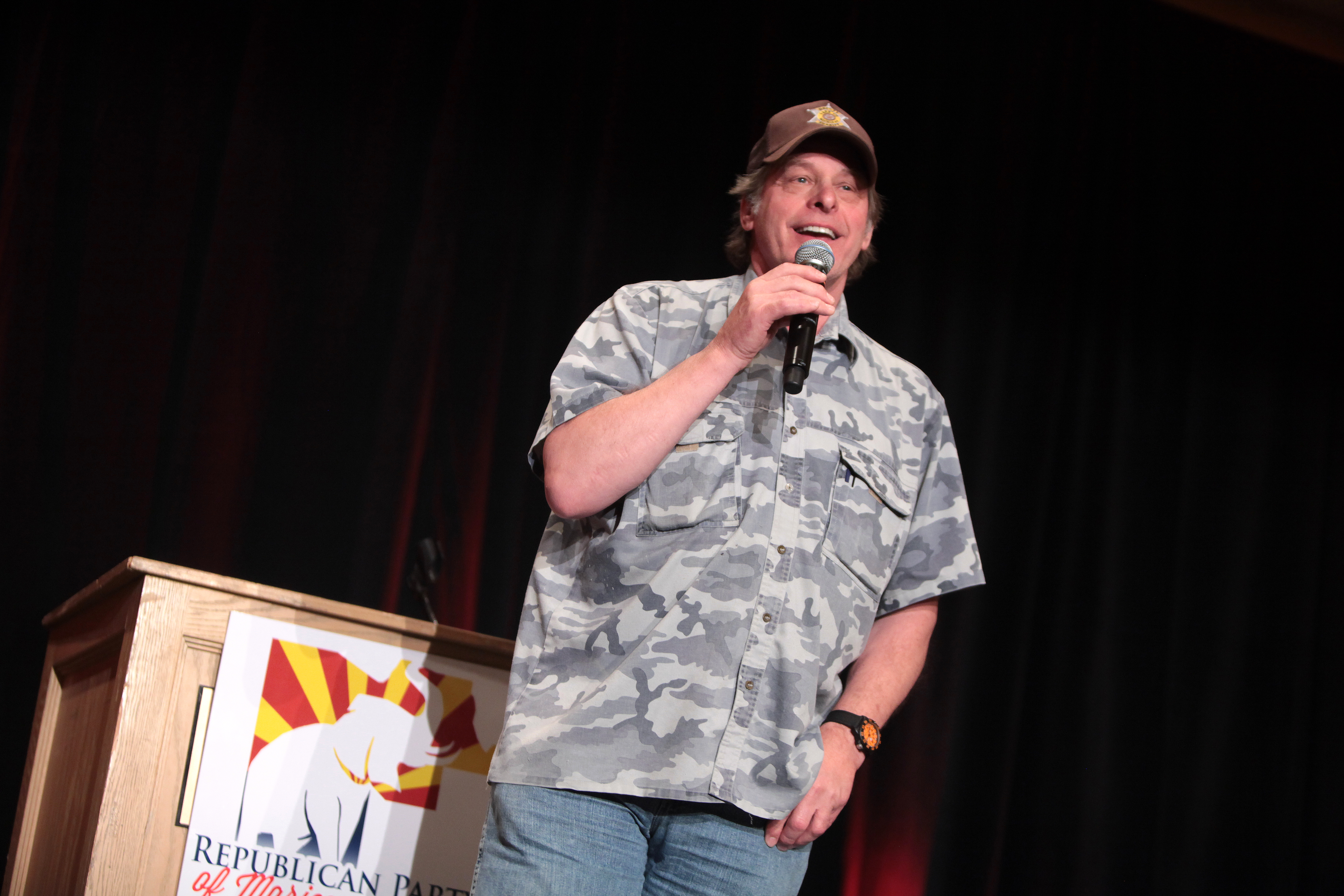
Ted Nugent, shown here addressing a Republican function in a military-style shirt, reportedly took extreme measures to avoid the draft.

=== Celebrities ===
For many decades after the Vietnam War ended, prominent Americans were being accused of having manipulated the draft system to their advantage.

In a 1970s High Times article, American singer-songwriter and future conservative activist Ted Nugent stated that he took crystal meth, and urinated and defecated in his pants before his physical, in order to avoid being drafted into the Vietnam War. In a 1990 interview with a large Detroit newspaper, Nugent made similar statements, and in 2014 Media Matters for America summarized and excerpted that interview, noting for example that before his physical Nugent was "virtually living inside pants caked with his own excrement", meanwhile imbibing "nothing but Vienna sausages and Pepsi".

Liberal actor and comedian Chevy Chase also misled his draft board. In 1989, approximately two decades after the fact, Chase revealed on a television talk show that he avoided the Vietnam War by making several false claims to his draft board, including that he harbored homosexual tendencies. He added he was "not very proud" of having done that. Several politically charged books subsequently discussed Chase's behavior.

Conservative talk radio show host Rush Limbaugh reportedly avoided the Vietnam draft because of anal cysts. In a 2011 book critical of Limbaugh, journalist John K. Wilson wrote, "As a man who evaded the Vietnam War draft with the help of an anal cyst, Limbaugh is a chickenhawk fond of making hyperbolic attacks on [liberal] foreign policy".

=== Politicians ===
Politicians whom opponents had accused of improperly avoiding the draft include George W. Bush, Dick Cheney, Bill Clinton and Donald Trump.

Former Republican presidential nominee Mitt Romney's deferment has been questioned. During the Vietnam War, The Church of Jesus Christ of Latter-day Saints (LDS Church) – Romney's church – became embroiled in controversy for deferring large numbers of its young members. The LDS Church eventually agreed to cap the number of missionary deferments it sought for members in any one region. After Romney dropped out of Stanford University and was about to lose his student deferment, he decided to become a missionary; and the LDS Church in his home state of Michigan chose to give him one of that state's missionary deferments. In a Salon article from 2007, liberal journalist Joe Conason noted that George W. Romney, Romney's father, had been governor of Michigan at the time.

Attention has also been paid to the fact that independent Senator Bernie Sanders did not serve in the war. In an article in The Atlantic, it was reported that, after graduating from the University of Chicago in 1964, and moving back to New York City, the future candidate for the Democratic Presidential nomination applied for conscientious objector status – even though as Sanders acknowledged to the reporter, he was not religious. (Sanders was opposed to the Vietnam War. At the time, however, CO status was granted entirely on the basis of religious opposition to all war.) Sanders's CO status was denied. Nevertheless, a "lengthy series of hearings, an FBI investigation and numerous postponements and delays" took him to age 26 at which point he was no longer eligible for the draft.

Donald Trump, who served as President of the United States from 2017 to 2021, and since 2025, was the beneficiary of a high lottery number 356 out of a possible 365. He graduated from college in the spring of 1968, making him eligible to be drafted and sent to Vietnam. In 1968, he received a 1-A status making him "Available for Service". Then he was reclassified as 1-Y "Available in emergency". In 1972, when the war was winding down, he received a diagnosis of bone spurs in his heels. The diagnosis resulted in a 4-F medical deferment, excusing him from military service. Due to this deferment he was accused of draft dodging, especially because as a candidate he could not recall which foot had the painful bone spurs.

Joe Biden, a former U.S. vice president and senator who became the 46th President of the United States in 2021, dodged military service in 1968 because of asthma as a teenager. An Associated Press (AP) story, run in The Washington Times, states: "In Promises to Keep, a memoir that was published [in 2007] …, Mr. Biden never mentions his asthma, recounting an active childhood, work as a lifeguard and football exploits in high school". A shorter version of the AP story ran in Newsday, a New York newspaper.

In Australia, alleged draft dodging by politicians has also been an issue. Robert Hill, Minister for Defence 2001–06, received a student deferral in 1966; he then went to London. Returning to Australia in 1970, he was rejected on unspecified "health grounds."
