= Robert McGill =

Robert McGill may refer to:

- Bob McGill (born 1962), Canadian retired ice hockey defenceman
- Robert McGill (writer) (born 1976), Canadian writer and literary critic
