= Mark Frutkin =

Canadian novelist and poet (born 1948)

Mark Frutkin (born January 2, 1948) is a Canadian novelist and poet. He has published ten books of fiction, three books of poetry, as well as two works of non-fiction and a book of essays. In 2022, his novel The Artist and the Assassin won the Silver Medal in the IPPY Awards (for books from independent publishers in Canada/US/Australia), in the category of literary fiction. In 2007, his novel, Fabrizio's Return, won the Trillium Prize for Best Book in Ontario and the Sunburst Award for Canadian Literature of the Fantastic, and was nominated for the Commonwealth Writers' Prize for Best Book (Canada/Caribbean region). In 1988, his novel, Atmospheres Apollinaire, was short-listed for a Governor General's Award and was also short-listed for the Trillium Award, as well as the Ottawa-Carleton Book Award. His works have been shortlisted for the Ottawa Book Awards five times.

Frutkin went to Canada in 1970 as a draft resister during the Vietnam War after obtaining a Bachelor of Arts from Loyola University in Chicago, US. In 1967-68 he studied at Loyola University in Rome, Italy. From 1970-80, he lived in a log cabin with no electricity or running water near Wolf Lake, Quebec. Since 1980, he has lived in Ottawa, Ontario, Canada with his wife, Faith.

As a journalist and critic he has written articles and reviews for The Globe and Mail, Harper's, the Ottawa Citizen, Montreal Gazette, Amazon.com/ca, Ottawa Magazine and other publications. His poetry and fiction have been published in numerous Canadian and foreign journals including Canadian Fiction Magazine, Descant, and Prism International.

== Works ==
- "The Walled Garden" (essays) - 2023 TBD (Upcoming)
- "The Artist and the Assassin" (non-fiction) - 2021
- "The Rising Tide" (non-fiction) - 2018
- "Hermit Thrush" (poetry) - 2016
- A Message for the Emperor (fiction) - 2012
- Colourless Green Ideas Sleep Furiously (essays) - 2012
- Walking Backwards (non-fiction) - 2011
- Erratic North (non-fiction) - 2008
- Fabrizio's Return (novel) – 2006 Winner of the 2006 Trillium Award for Best Book in Ontario; Winner of Sunburst Award; Finalist for Commonwealth Award (Canada/Caribbean region)
- Slow Lightning (novel) - 2001
- The Lion Of Venice (novel) -1997
- In The Time Of The Angry Queen (novel) -1993
- Invading Tibet (novel) -1991
- Atmospheres Apollinaire (novel) –1988, re-issued - 1998 (Finalist for Governor General's Award for Fiction in 1988; finalist for Trillium Award; finalist for Ottawa-Carleton Book Award)
- The Growing Dawn (novel) -1983
- Iron Mountain (poetry) - 2001
- Acts Of Light (poetry) -1992
- The Alchemy Of Clouds (poetry) - 1985
