= Frank Kusch =

Historian and author

Frank Kusch

Frank Kusch is a historian of American history, who writes on post-1945 political and cultural events. Kusch is the author of Constructing Nixon's Majority: Winning Rhetoric in the Presidential Election of 1972 (November, 2026), Battleground Chicago: the Police and the 1968 Democratic National Convention (September, 2007) and All American Boys: Draft Dodgers in Canada from the Vietnam War (August, 2001).

Kusch has served as an editor and copy editor for publishing houses, newspapers, magazines, including government and civic publications. He has also worked as a media and communications consultant, including speechwriting for federal and provincial politicians in Canada. Kusch has earned a Ph.D from the University of Saskatchewan in Saskatoon, Saskatchewan, Canada, and a Master's Degree from Ohio University in Athens, Ohio. Kusch works in Teaching, Learning, and Student Experience, with the University of Saskatchewan.

As a literary writer, Kusch's first novel, Remy, will be published by BWL Publishing in May 2027. He is currently working on a second novel set in Saskatchewan at the end of the Second World War, called Birthmark.

== Publications ==
- Constructing Nixon's Majority: Winning Rhetoric in the Presidential Election of 1972 (New York: Bloomsbury Academic, 2026)
- “Behind the Billy Club: Chicago Police and the Violence at the 1968 Democratic National Convention,” in The Routledge History of Police Brutality in America, (New York: Routledge, 2023).
- Battleground Chicago: the Police and the 1968 Democratic National Convention (University of Chicago Press, 2007). An excerpt from the book. a review of the book.
- All American Boys: Draft Dodgers in Canada from the Vietnam War (Praeger Publishers, August, 2001)
- Remy: A novel (May 2027 release)
