= 1001 Ways to Beat the Draft =

1966 satirical anti-war essay by Robert Bashlow and Tuli Kupferberg

- Author: Robert Bashlow and Tuli Kupferberg
- Genre: political protest, black comedy, satire
- Publication date: 1966

"1001 Ways to Beat the Draft" is a satirical Vietnam War protest pamphlet written in 1966 by Robert Bashlow and Tuli Kupferberg. It was also published in book format.

The text reels through dozens of ways that young men facing conscription during the Vietnam War could avoid service. Kupferberg leaves no societal more unscathed in this anti-war pamphlet, which is considered one of the most notable antiwar publications. Donald L. Simons, in his autobiography I Refuse: Memories of a Vietnam War Objector, wrote "It is not possible to determine how many men successfully fooled the system, but stories of attempts, and how to do it, became part of the Sixties culture. The most famous examples were Arlo Guthrie's 1967 classic folk song, "Alice's Restaurant", and the book, 1001 Ways to Beat the Draft."

The pamphlet was published originally by Oliver Layton Press, New York; Kupferberg also printed it under his publishing label, Birth Press, and an illustrated version from Grove Press came out in 1967. Kupferberg published other humorous lists in the same format, including 1001 Ways to Live Without Working and 1001 Ways to Make Love.

An excerpt was included in Viking Press's The Portable Beat Reader.

== Excerpt ==
1. Grope J. Edgar Hoover in the silent halls of Congress.

2. Get thee to a nunnery.

3. Fly to the moon and refuse to come home.

4. Die.

5. Become Secretary of Defense.

6. Become Secretary of State.

7. Become Secretary of Health, Education and Welfare.

8. Show a li'l tit.

9. Castrate yourself.

== See also ==
- "Draft Dodger Rag"
