= Dreams Die Hard =

Autobiographical book by David Harris

- First edition cover
- Author: David Harris
- Language: English
- Publisher: St. Martin's/Marek
- Publication date: 1982
- ISBN: 0-312-21956-3 (first edition)
- LC Class: CT220 .H35

Dreams Die Hard is an autobiographical book published in 1982 and re-issued in 1993 by David Harris, a prominent anti-Vietnam War activist during the 1960s.

The book chronicles the experiences of three men (Harris, Allard Lowenstein, and Dennis Sweeney) amid the political and social tumult of the 1960s, as well as the aftermath of these experiences. Specifically, paranoid schizophrenia and two decades of accumulated disillusionment and homophobia eventually led a deranged Sweeney to murder Lowenstein.

One-term Congressman Lowenstein, "the world's oldest student activist," had, by his forties, lived decades in various political arenas. From the Mississippi Freedom Summer project in the Deep South, to the Dump Johnson campaign of 1968, Allard was passionate and well-connected in liberal circles. He was most likely bisexual before the word was current.

Harris's detailed and historical narration, written in an attempt to explain the lives of each of the characters, discusses how the three activists began their affiliations at Stanford University, and continued through the turbulent decade.

Lowenstein's sexual orientation reappears throughout the book and serves as one of many connections between the three main figures: both Harris and Sweeney rejected overt passes from Lowenstein; Harris's reaction was thoughtful, empathetic, and verbal; but Sweeney's reaction was decidedly irrational and physical and ended in murder.

Dreams Die Hard was adapted into a two-act play of the same name by John Binder which was first produced at the Met Theater in Hollywood in 1995.
