= Robert McGill (writer) =

Canadian writer and literary critic (born 1976)

Robert McGill (born 1976) is a Canadian writer and literary critic. He was born and raised in Wiarton, Ontario. His parents were physical education teachers. He graduated from Queen's University in Kingston, Ontario in 1999. He attended the University of Oxford as a Rhodes Scholar, then completed the MA program in Creative Writing at the University of East Anglia. After graduating with a PhD in English from the University of Toronto, Robert moved to Cambridge, Massachusetts, and took up a Junior Fellowship with the Harvard University Society of Fellows. He now teaches Creative Writing and Canadian Literature at the University of Toronto.

== Writing ==
=== Novels ===
McGill wrote his first novel, The Mysteries, at the University of East Anglia. It was published in 2004, when he was 28. The Mysteries tells of the disappearance of a woman from a fictional small town and the uncovering of local secrets. Told from twelve characters’ perspectives, the story moves back and forward over two years. Prominent in the novel is a stone henge inspired by the real Keppel Henge in Big Bay, Ontario.

McGill began his second novel, Once We Had a Country, while a Harvard Junior Fellow. Once We Had a Country tells the story of a young schoolteacher named Maggie who leaves the United States with her boyfriend, Fletcher, in the summer of 1972 to start a commune on a farm near Niagara Falls. When the US government ends the military draft for the Vietnam War, Fletcher faces family pressure to return home, while Maggie has to deal with the disappearance of her father, a missionary in Laos.

McGill's third novel, A Suitable Companion for the End of Your Life, was published in 2022.

=== Short fiction ===
McGill's short fiction has been published in literary magazines including Grain, Descant, and The Fiddlehead, as well as in Toronto Life, The Dalhousie Review, and The New Quarterly. In 2013 his story “The Stress of Lives” was published in Hazlitt and in 2021 his story "Something Something Alice Munro" was published in The Atlantic.

In 2024 he published the short story collection Simple Creatures.

=== Literary criticism ===
McGill's book The Treacherous Imagination: Intimacy, Ethics, and Autobiographical Fiction investigates people's sense of betrayal when they believe they have been turned into characters in novels or stories.

In 2017, he published a second monograph, War Is Here: The Vietnam War and Canadian Literature. He has also edited an online anthology, Canadian Literature of the Vietnam War.

His other academic publications include articles on Canadian writers Alice Munro, Elizabeth Smart, Thomas King, Hugh MacLennan, and Michael Ondaatje, as well as articles on teaching literary citizenship (co-authored with André Babyn), biographical interpretation in fiction workshops, negotiating cultural difference in creative writing workshops (co-authored with Noor Naga), and myths of literary mentorship (co-authored with Neil Surkan).

=== Prizes and honors ===
In 2001, McGill was a finalist for the RBC Bronwen Wallace Award for Emerging Writers. In 2002, two of his stories, “Confidence Men” and “The Stars Are Falling,” were nominated for the Journey Prize and selected for the Journey Prize Anthology 14. In 2003, his story “Nobody Goes to Vancouver to Die” was shortlisted for a Canadian National Magazine Award.

The Mysteries was named one of the top five Canadian fiction books of 2004 by Quill & Quire. It was also the winner of the 2006 Western Reads competition, garnering twice as many votes as the second-place book.

McGill's scholarly writing has won the Juliet McLauchlan Prize of the Joseph Conrad Society, as well as the George Wicken Prize in Canadian Literature.

In 2018, McGill won the Robert Kroetsch Teaching Award from Canadian Creative Writers and Writing Programs (CCWWP).

Simple Creatures was shortlisted for the 2025 Atwood Gibson Writers' Trust Fiction Prize.
