= Hollyhock (disambiguation) =

A hollyhock can refer to several flowering plants of the genus Alcea.

Hollyhock may also refer to:

- Mito Hollyhock, a Japanese professional football club that is currently playing in the J2 League
- Iliamna rivularis, a species of perennial plant commonly known as streambank wild hollyhock
- Hollyhock Manheim-Mannheim-Guerrero-Robinson-Zilberschlag-Hsung-Fonzarelli-McQuack, a character on the American animated series BoJack Horseman
- Hollyhock Retreat in British Columbia, Canada
