= Emily Rose =

Emily Rose may refer to:

- Emily Rose (actress) (born 1981), American television actress/voice actress
- The Exorcism of Emily Rose, a 2005 supernatural horror crime film about demonic possession, loosely based on the story of Anneliese Michel (1952–1976)

== See also ==
- Emily Rosa (born 1987), American skeptic and medical researcher
