= New Age =

Range of new religious beliefs and practices

New Age is a range of spiritual or religious practices and beliefs that rapidly grew in Western society during the early 1970s. Its highly eclectic and unsystematic structure makes a precise definition difficult. Although many scholars consider it a religious movement, its adherents typically see it as spiritual or as a unification of mind, body, and spirit, and rarely use the term New Age themselves. Scholars often call it the New Age movement, although others contest this term and suggest it is better seen as a milieu or zeitgeist.

As a form of Western esotericism, the New Age drew heavily upon esoteric traditions such as the occultism of the eighteenth and nineteenth centuries, including the work of Emanuel Swedenborg and Franz Mesmer, as well as Spiritualism, New Thought, and Theosophy. More immediately, it arose from mid-20th-century influences such as the UFO religions of the 1950s, the counterculture of the 1960s, and the Human Potential Movement. Its exact origins remain contested, but it became a major movement in the 1970s, at which time it was centered largely in the United Kingdom. It expanded widely in the 1980s and 1990s. By the start of the 21st century, the term New Age was increasingly rejected within this milieu, with some scholars arguing that the New Age phenomenon had ended.

Despite its eclectic nature, the New Age has several main currents. Theologically, the New Age typically accepts a holistic form of divinity that pervades the universe, including human beings themselves, leading to a strong emphasis on the spiritual authority of the self. This is accompanied by a common belief in a variety of semi-divine non-human entities such as angels, with whom humans can communicate, particularly by channeling through a human intermediary. Typically viewing history as divided into spiritual ages, a common New Age belief posits a forgotten age of great technological advancement and spiritual wisdom that declined into periods of increasing violence and spiritual degeneracy, which will now be remedied by the emergence of an Age of Aquarius, from which the milieu gets its name. There is also a strong focus on healing, particularly using forms of alternative medicine, and an emphasis on unifying science with spirituality.

The dedication of New Agers varied considerably, from those who adopted a number of New Age ideas and practices to those who fully embraced and dedicated their lives to it. The New Age has generated criticism from Christians as well as modern Pagan and Indigenous communities. From the 1990s onward, the New Age became the subject of research by academic scholars of religious studies.

== Definitions ==
One of the few things on which all scholars agree concerning New Age is that it is difficult to define. Often, the definition given actually reflects the background of the scholar giving the definition. Thus, the New Ager views New Age as a revolutionary period of history dictated by the stars; the Christian apologist has often defined new age as a cult; the historian of ideas understands it as a manifestation of the perennial tradition; the philosopher sees New Age as a monistic or holistic worldview; the sociologist describes New Age as a new religious movement (NRM); while the psychologist describes it as a form of narcissism.

— Scholar of religion Daren Kemp, 2004

The New Age phenomenon has proved difficult to define, with much scholarly disagreement as to its scope. The scholars Steven J. Sutcliffe and Ingvild Sælid Gilhus have even suggested that it remains "among the most disputed of categories in the study of religion".

The scholar of religion Paul Heelas characterised the New Age as "an eclectic hotch-potch of beliefs, practices, and ways of life" that can be identified as a singular phenomenon through their use of "the same (or very similar) lingua franca to do with the human (and planetary) condition and how it can be transformed." Similarly, the historian of religion Olav Hammer termed it "a common denominator for a variety of quite divergent contemporary popular practices and beliefs" that have emerged since the late 1970s and are "largely united by historical links, a shared discourse and an air de famille". According to Hammer, this New Age was a "fluid and fuzzy cultic milieu". The sociologist of religion Michael York described the New Age as "an umbrella term that includes a great variety of groups and identities" that are united by their "expectation of a major and universal change being primarily founded on the individual and collective development of human potential."

The scholar of religion Wouter Hanegraaff adopted a different approach by asserting that "New Age" was "a label attached indiscriminately to whatever seems to fit it" and that as a result it "means very different things to different people". He thus argued against the idea that the New Age could be considered "a unified ideology or Weltanschauung", although he believed that it could be considered a "more or less unified 'movement'." Other scholars have suggested that the New Age is too diverse to be a singular movement. The scholar of religion George D. Chryssides called it "a counter-cultural Zeitgeist", while the sociologist of religion Steven Bruce suggested that New Age was a milieu; Heelas and scholar of religion Linda Woodhead called it the "holistic milieu".

There is no central authority within the New Age phenomenon that can determine what counts as New Age and what does not. Many of those groups and individuals who could analytically be categorised as part of the New Age reject the term New Age in reference to themselves. Some even express active hostility to the term. Rather than terming themselves New Agers, those involved in this milieu commonly describe themselves as spiritual "seekers", and some self-identify as a member of a different religious group, such as Christianity, Judaism, or Buddhism. In 2003 Sutcliffe observed that the use of the term New Age was "optional, episodic and declining overall", adding that among the very few individuals who did use it, they usually did so with qualification, for instance by placing it in quotation marks. Other academics, such as Sara MacKian, have argued that the sheer diversity of the New Age renders the term too problematic for scholars to use. MacKian proposed "everyday spirituality" as an alternate term.

While acknowledging that New Age was a problematic term, the scholar of religion James R. Lewis stated that it remained a useful etic category for scholars to use because "There exists no comparable term which covers all aspects of the movement." Similarly, Chryssides argued that the fact that "New Age" is a "theoretical concept" does not "undermine its usefulness or employability"; he drew comparisons with "Hinduism", a similar "Western etic piece of vocabulary" that scholars of religion used despite its problems.

=== Religion, spirituality, and esotericism ===
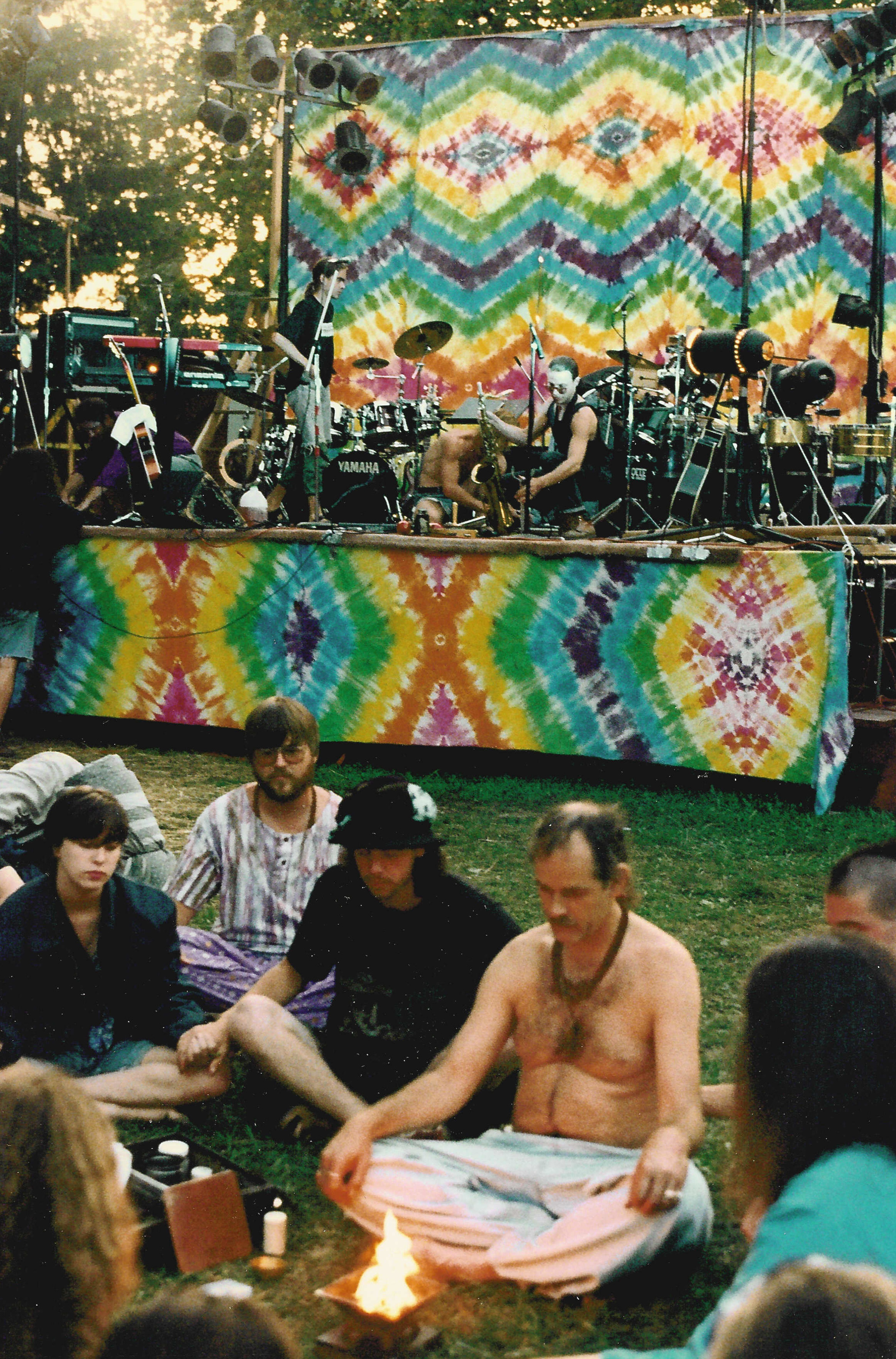
New Age meditation group at the Snoqualmie Moondance festival, 1992

In discussing the New Age, academics have varyingly referred to "New Age spirituality" and "New Age religion". Those involved in the New Age rarely consider it to be "religion"—negatively associating that term solely with organized religion—and instead describe their practices as "spirituality". Religious studies scholars, however, have repeatedly referred to the New Age milieu as a "religion". York described the New Age as a new religious movement (NRM). Conversely, both Heelas and Sutcliffe rejected this categorisation; Heelas believed that while elements of the New Age represented NRMs, this did not apply to every New Age group. Similarly, Chryssides stated that the New Age could not be seen as "a religion" in itself.

The New Age movement is the cultic milieu having become conscious of itself, in the later 1970s, as constituting a more or less unified "movement". All manifestations of this movement are characterized by a popular western culture criticism expressed in terms of a secularized esotericism.

— Scholar of esotericism Wouter Hanegraaff, 1996.

The New Age is also a form of Western esotericism. Hanegraaff regarded the New Age as a form of "popular culture criticism", in that it represented a reaction against the dominant Western values of Judeo-Christian religion and rationalism, adding that "New Age religion formulates such criticism not at random, but falls back on" the ideas of earlier Western esoteric groups.

The New Age has also been identified by various scholars of religion as part of the cultic milieu. This concept, developed by the sociologist Colin Campbell, refers to a social network of marginalized ideas. Through their shared marginalization within a given society, these disparate ideas interact and create new syntheses.

Hammer identified much of the New Age as corresponding to the concept of "folk religions" in that it seeks to deal with existential questions regarding subjects like death and disease in "an unsystematic fashion, often through a process of bricolage from already available narratives and rituals". York also heuristically divides the New Age into three broad trends. The first, the social camp, represents groups that primarily seek to bring about social change, while the second, the occult camp, instead focuses on contact with spirit entities and channeling. York's third group, the spiritual camp, represents a middle ground between these two camps that focuses largely on individual development.

=== Terminology ===
The term new age, along with related terms like new era and new world, long predate the emergence of the New Age movement, and have widely been used to assert that a better way of life for humanity is dawning. It occurs commonly, for instance, in political contexts; the Great Seal of the United States, designed in 1782, proclaims a "new order of ages", while in the 1980s the Soviet General Secretary Mikhail Gorbachev proclaimed that "all mankind is entering a new age". The term has also appeared within Western esoteric schools of thought, having a scattered use from the mid-nineteenth century onward. In 1864 the American Swedenborgian Warren Felt Evans published The New Age and its Message about the teachings of the unity/correspondence of natural and spiritual worlds of the Swedish mystic Emanuel Swedenborg, while in 1907 Alfred Orage and Holbrook Jackson began editing a weekly journal of Christian liberalism and socialism titled The New Age. The concept of a coming "new age" that would be inaugurated by the return to Earth of Jesus Christ was a theme in the poetry of Wellesley Tudor Pole (1884–1968) and of Johanna Brandt (1876–1964), and then also appeared in the work of the British-born American Theosophist Alice Bailey (1880–1949), featuring in titles such as Discipleship in the New Age (1944) and Education in the New Age (1954).

Between the 1930s and 1960s, a small number of groups and individuals became preoccupied with the concept of a coming "New Age" and used the term accordingly. The term had thus become a recurring motif in the esoteric spirituality milieu. Sutcliffe, therefore, expressed the view that while the term New Age had originally been an "apocalyptic emblem", it would only be later that it became "a tag or codeword for a 'spiritual' idiom".

== History ==
=== Antecedents in occult and theosophy ===
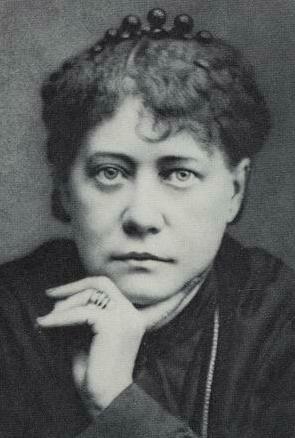
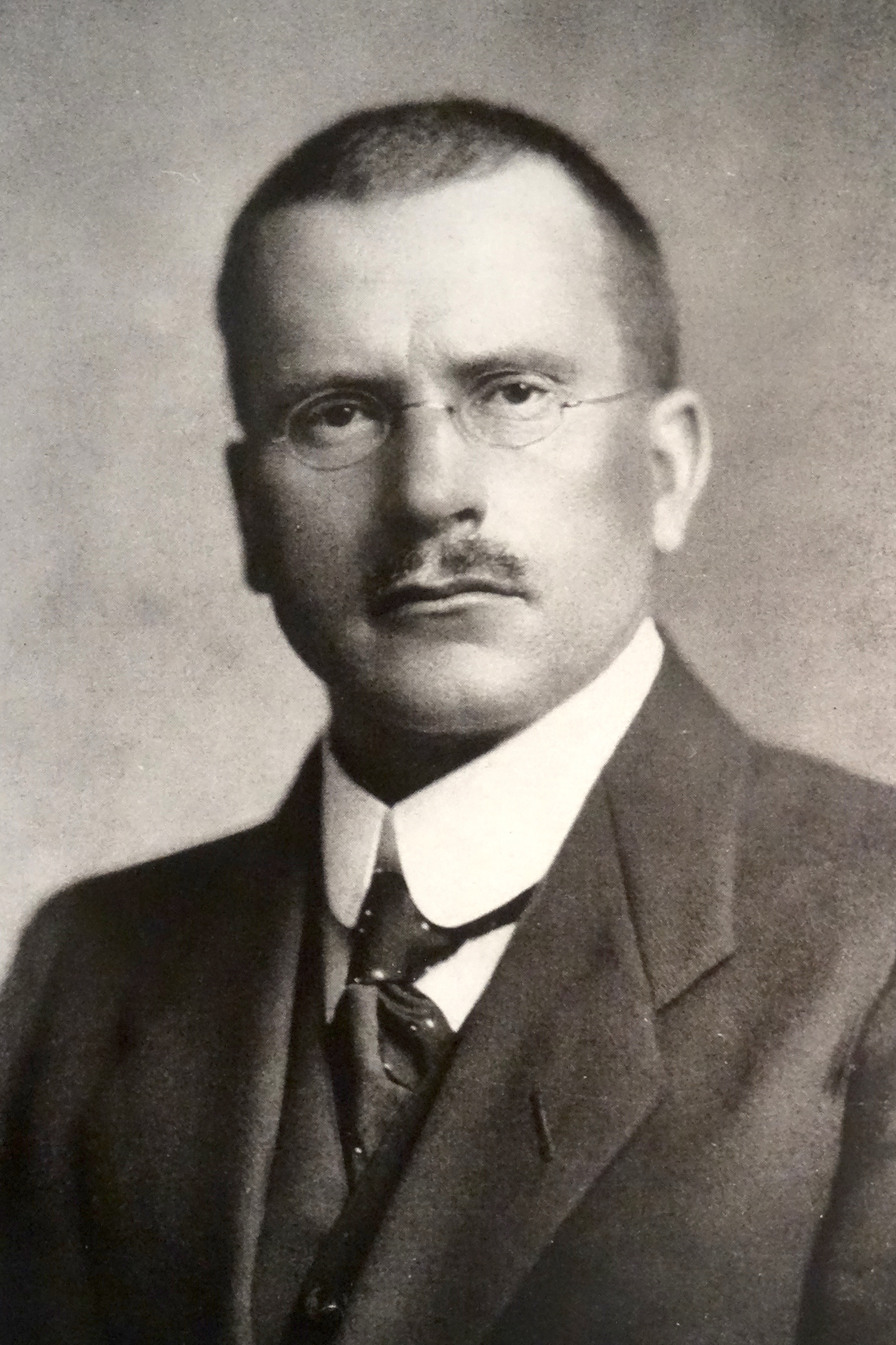
Esoteric thinkers who influenced the New Age include Helena Blavatsky (left) and Carl Jung (right)

According to scholar Nevill Drury, the New Age has a "tangible history", although Hanegraaff expressed the view that most New Agers were "surprisingly ignorant about the actual historical roots of their beliefs". Similarly, Hammer thought that "source amnesia" was a "building block of a New Age worldview", with New Agers typically adopting ideas with no awareness of where those ideas originated.

As a form of Western esotericism, the New Age has antecedents that stretch back to southern Europe in Late Antiquity. Following the Age of Enlightenment in 18th-century Europe, new esoteric ideas developed in response to the development of scientific rationality. Scholars call this new esoteric trend occultism, and this occultism was a key factor in the development of the worldview from which the New Age emerged.

One of the earliest influences on the New Age was the Swedish 18th-century Christian mystic Emanuel Swedenborg, who professed the ability to communicate with angels, demons, and spirits. Swedenborg's attempt to unite science and religion and his prediction of a coming era in particular have been cited as ways that he prefigured the New Age. Another early influence was the late 18th and early 19th century German physician and hypnotist Franz Mesmer, who wrote about the existence of a force known as "animal magnetism" running through the human body. The establishment of Spiritualism, an occult religion influenced by both Swedenborgianism and Mesmerism, in the U.S. during the 1840s has also been identified as a precursor to the New Age, in particular through its rejection of established Christianity, representing itself as a scientific approach to religion, and its emphasis on channeling spirit entities.

Most of the beliefs which characterise the New Age were already present by the end of the 19th century, even to such an extent that one may legitimately wonder whether the New Age brings anything new at all.

— Historian of religion Wouter Hanegraaff, 1996.

A further major influence on the New Age was the Theosophical Society, an occult group co-founded by the Russian Helena Blavatsky in the late 19th century. In her books Isis Unveiled (1877) and The Secret Doctrine (1888), Blavatsky wrote that her Society was conveying the essence of all world religions, and it thus emphasized a focus on comparative religion. Serving as a partial bridge between Theosophical ideas and those of the New Age was the American esotericist Edgar Cayce, who founded the Association for Research and Enlightenment. Another partial bridge was the Danish mystic Martinus who is popular in Scandinavia.

Another influence was New Thought, which developed in late nineteenth-century New England as a Christian-oriented healing movement before spreading throughout the United States. Another influence was the psychologist Carl Jung. Drury also identified as an important influence upon the New Age the Indian Swami Vivekananda, an adherent of the philosophy of Vedanta who first brought Hinduism to the West in the late 19th century.

According to Catholic scholars, anthroposophy belongs to the New Age. George D. Chryssides also considers Rudolf Steiner to be New Age, or at least a forerunner of the New Age. John Paull considers him a New Age philosopher. Nicholas Campion says Steiner was a New Age Christian. Campion stated that "Anthroposophy is perhaps the most vibrant of New Age movements". Even allowing that Steiner himself was not New Age, an author wrote "anthroposophy—a spiritual movement that is the basis for much of the New Age thinking in Europe and North America today." Roger E. Olson and Dominic Corrywright agree. The New Age Encyclopedia lists Steiner among the luminaries of the New Age. Wouter Hanegraaff discusses two meanings of "New Age": Steiner fits one meaning, but not the other; the difference lies in the absence of the psychologization initiated by the New Thought. That is, Steiner lies at the root of New Age sensu stricto.

Hanegraaff believed that the New Age's direct antecedents could be found in the UFO religions of the 1950s, which he termed a "proto-New Age movement". Many of these new religious movements had strong apocalyptic beliefs regarding a coming new age, which they typically asserted would be brought about by contact with extraterrestrials. Examples of such groups included the Aetherius Society, founded in the UK in 1955, and the Heralds of the New Age, established in New Zealand in 1956.

=== 1960s ===
From a historical perspective, the New Age phenomenon is most associated with the counterculture of the 1960s. According to author Andrew Grant Jackson, George Harrison's adoption of Hindu philosophy and Indian instrumentation in his songs with the Beatles in the mid-1960s, together with the band's highly publicised study of Transcendental Meditation, "truly kick-started" the Human Potential Movement that subsequently became New Age. Although not common throughout the counterculture, usage of the terms New Age and Age of Aquarius—used in reference to a coming era—were found within it, for instance appearing on adverts for the Woodstock festival of 1969, and in the lyrics of "Aquarius", the opening song of the 1967 musical Hair: The American Tribal Love-Rock Musical.

This decade also witnessed the emergence of a variety of new religious movements and newly established religions in the United States, creating a spiritual milieu from which the New Age drew upon; these included the San Francisco Zen Center, Transcendental Meditation, Soka Gakkai, the Inner Peace Movement, the Church of All Worlds, and the Church of Satan. Although there had been an established interest in Asian religious ideas in the U.S. from at least the eighteenth-century, many of these new developments were variants of Hinduism, Buddhism, and Sufism, which had been imported to the West from Asia following the U.S. government's decision to rescind the Asian Exclusion Act in 1965. In 1962 the Esalen Institute was established in Big Sur, California. Esalen and similar personal growth centers had developed links to humanistic psychology, and from this, the human potential movement emerged and strongly influenced the New Age.

In Britain, a number of small religious groups that came to be identified as the "light" movement had begun declaring the existence of a coming new age, influenced strongly by the Theosophical ideas of Blavatsky and Bailey. The most prominent of these groups was the Findhorn Foundation, which founded the Findhorn Ecovillage in the Scottish area of Findhorn, Moray in 1962. Although its founders were from an older generation, Findhorn attracted increasing numbers of countercultural baby boomers during the 1960s, to the extent that its population had grown sixfold to c. 120 residents by 1972. In October 1965, the co-founder of Findhorn Foundation, Peter Caddy, a former member of the occult Rosicrucian Order Crotona Fellowship, attended a meeting of various figures within Britain's esoteric milieu; advertised as "The Significance of the Group in the New Age", it was held at Attingham Park over the course of a weekend.

All of these groups created the backdrop from which the New Age movement emerged. As James R. Lewis and J. Gordon Melton point out, the New Age phenomenon represents "a synthesis of many different preexisting movements and strands of thought". Nevertheless, York asserted that while the New Age bore many similarities with both earlier forms of Western esotericism and Asian religion, it remained "distinct from its predecessors in its own self-consciousness as a new way of thinking".

=== Emergence and development: c. 1970–2000 ===
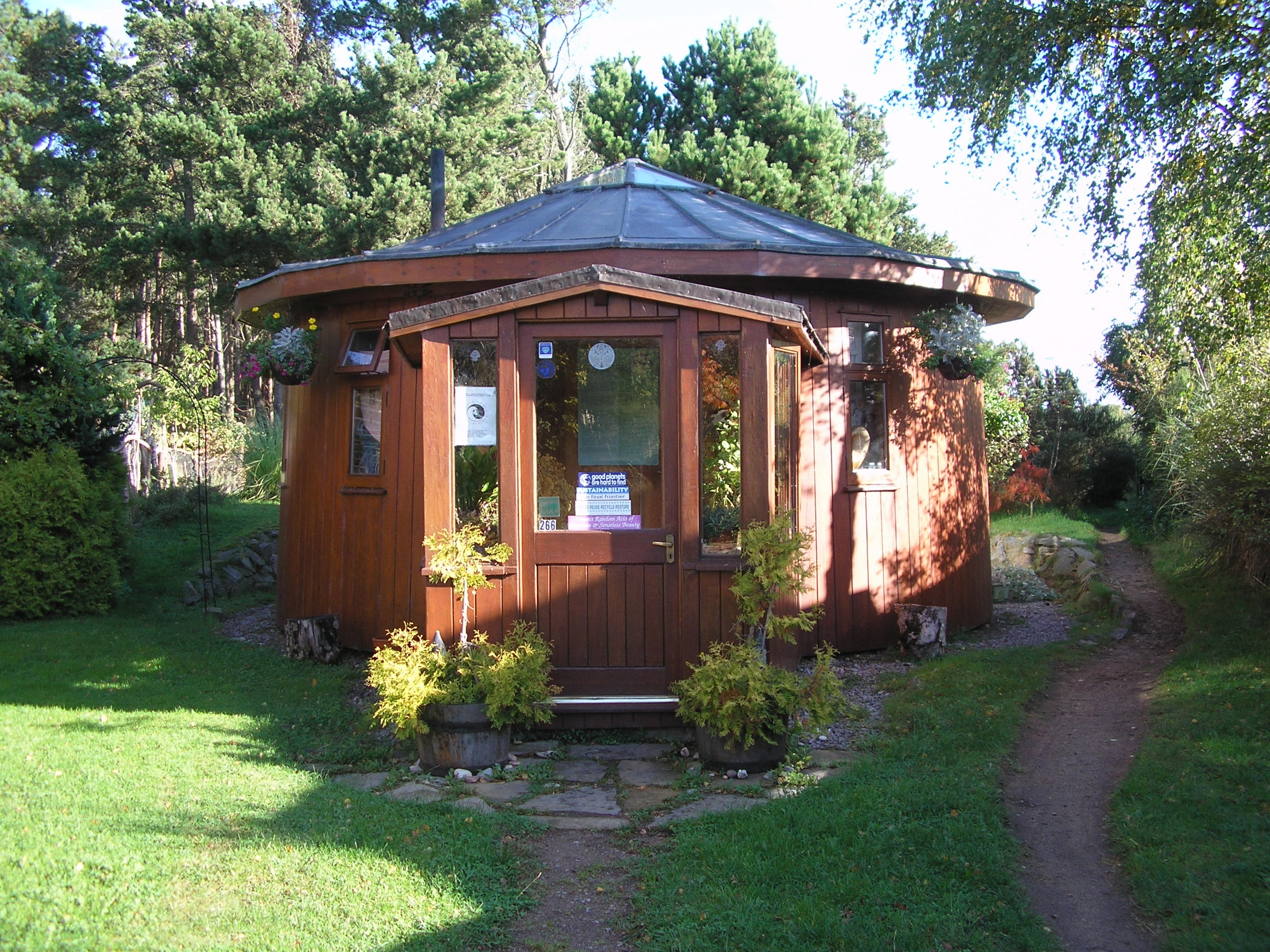
This barrel house was the first dwelling constructed at the Findhorn Ecovillage

The late 1950s saw the first stirrings within the cultic milieu of a belief in a coming new age. A variety of small movements arose, revolving around revealed messages from beings in space and presenting a synthesis of post-Theosophical and other esoteric doctrines. These movements might have remained marginal, had it not been for the explosion of the counterculture in the 1960s and early 1970s. Various historical threads ... began to converge: nineteenth century doctrinal elements such as Theosophy and post-Theosophical esotericism as well as harmonious or positive thinking were now eclectically combined with ... religious psychologies: transpersonal psychology, Jungianism and a variety of Eastern teachings. It became perfectly feasible for the same individuals to consult the I Ching, practice Jungian astrology, read Abraham Maslow's writings on peak experiences, etc. The reason for the ready incorporation of such disparate sources was a similar goal of exploring an individualized and largely non-Christian religiosity.

— Scholar of esotericism Olav Hammer, 2001.

By the early 1970s, use of the term New Age was increasingly common within the cultic milieu. This was because—according to Sutcliffe—the "emblem" of the "New Age" had been passed from the "subcultural pioneers" in groups like Findhorn to the wider array of "countercultural baby boomers" between c. 1967 and 1974. He noted that as this happened, the meaning of the term New Age changed; whereas it had once referred specifically to a coming era, at this point it came to be used in a wider sense to refer to a variety of spiritual activities and practices. In the latter part of the 1970s, the New Age expanded to cover a wide variety of alternative spiritual and religious beliefs and practices, not all of which explicitly held to the belief in the Age of Aquarius, but were nevertheless widely recognized as broadly similar in their search for "alternatives" to mainstream society. In doing so, the "New Age" became a banner under which to bring together the wider "cultic milieu" of American society.

The counterculture of the 1960s had rapidly declined by the start of the 1970s, in large part due to the collapse of the commune movement, but it would be many former members of the counter-culture and hippie subculture who subsequently became early adherents of the New Age movement. The exact origins of the New Age movement remain an issue of debate; Melton asserted that it emerged in the early 1970s, whereas Hanegraaff instead traced its emergence to the latter 1970s, adding that it then entered its full development in the 1980s. This early form of the movement was based largely in Britain and exhibited a strong influence from theosophy and Anthroposophy. Hanegraaff termed this early core of the movement the New Age sensu stricto, or "New Age in the strict sense".

Hanegraaff terms the broader development the New Age sensu lato, or "New Age in the wider sense". Stores that came to be known as "New Age shops" opened up, selling related books, magazines, jewelry, and crystals, and they were typified by the playing of New Age music and the smell of incense.This probably influenced several thousand small metaphysical book- and gift-stores that increasingly defined themselves as "New Age bookstores", while New Age titles came to be increasingly available from mainstream bookstores and then websites like Amazon.com.

Not everyone who came to be associated with the New Age phenomenon openly embraced the term New Age, although it was popularised in books like David Spangler's 1977 work Revelation: The Birth of a New Age and Mark Satin's 1979 book New Age Politics: Healing Self and Society. Marilyn Ferguson's 1982 book The Aquarian Conspiracy has also been regarded as a landmark work in the development of the New Age, promoting the idea that a new era was emerging. Other terms that were employed synonymously with New Age in this milieu included "Green", "Holistic", "Alternative", and "Spiritual".

1971 witnessed the foundation of est by Werner H. Erhard, a transformational training course that became a part of the early movement. Melton suggested that the 1970s witnessed the growth of a relationship between the New Age movement and the older New Thought movement, as evidenced by the widespread use of Helen Schucman's A Course in Miracles (1975), New Age music, and crystal healing in New Thought churches. Some figures in the New Thought movement were skeptical, challenging the compatibility of New Age and New Thought perspectives. During these decades, Findhorn had become a site of pilgrimage for many New Agers, and greatly expanded in size as people joined the community, with workshops and conferences being held there that brought together New Age thinkers from across the world.

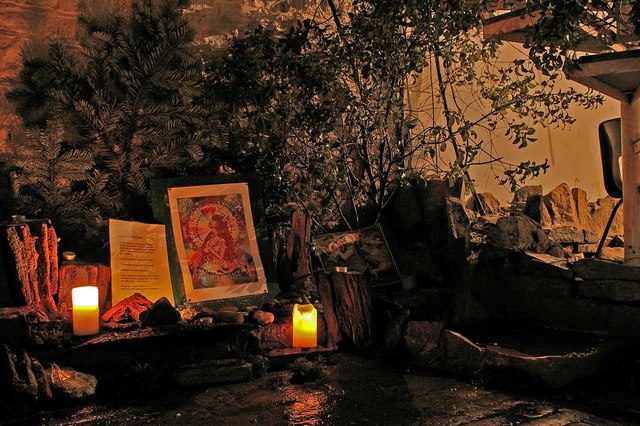
New Age shrine in Glastonbury, England

Several key events occurred, which raised public awareness of the New Age subculture: publication of Linda Goodman's best-selling astrology books Sun Signs (1968) and Love Signs (1978); the release of Shirley MacLaine's book Out on a Limb (1983), later adapted into a television mini-series with the same name (1987); and the "Harmonic Convergence" planetary alignment on August 16 and 17, 1987, organized by José Argüelles in Sedona, Arizona. The Convergence attracted more people to the movement than any other single event. Heelas suggested that the movement was influenced by the "enterprise culture" encouraged by the U.S. and U.K. governments during the 1980s onward, with its emphasis on initiative and self-reliance resonating with any New Age ideas.

Channelers Jane Roberts (Seth Material), Helen Schucman (A Course in Miracles), J. Z. Knight (Ramtha), Neale Donald Walsch (Conversations with God) contributed to the movement's growth. The first significant exponent of the New Age movement in the U.S. has been cited as Ram Dass. Core works in the propagating of New Age ideas included Jane Roberts's Seth series, published from 1972 onward, Helen Schucman's 1975 publication A Course in Miracles, and James Redfield's 1993 work The Celestine Prophecy. A number of these books became best sellers, such as the Seth book series which quickly sold over a million copies. Supplementing these books were videos, audiotapes, compact discs and websites. The development of the internet in particular further popularized New Age ideas and made them more widely accessible.

New Age ideas influenced the development of rave culture in the late 1980s and 1990s. In Britain during the 1980s, the term New Age Travellers came into use, although York characterised this term as "a misnomer created by the media". These New Age Travellers had little to do with the New Age as the term was used more widely, with scholar of religion Daren Kemp observing that "New Age spirituality is not an essential part of New Age Traveller culture, although there are similarities between the two worldviews". In the USA, New Age bookstores doubled during the 1980s, a few New Age radio stations (WBMW, KTWV) became popular, a special New Age music prize was introduced at The Grammys, and some large companies hired "faith healers" to cure their workers' productivity. The movement was very trendy, including among high-finance workers, and its success led many to bank on the trend selling development programs, with no supervisory body to regulate the accuracy or efficiency of the methods marketed.

The term New Age came to be used increasingly widely by the popular media in the 1990s.

=== Decline or transformation: 1990–present ===
By the late 1980s, some publishers dropped the term New Age as a marketing device. In 1994, the scholar of religion Gordon J. Melton presented a conference paper in which he argued that, given that he knew of nobody describing their practices as "New Age" anymore, the New Age had died. In 2001, Hammer observed that the term New Age had increasingly been rejected as either pejorative or meaningless by individuals within the Western cultic milieu. He also noted that within this milieu it was not being replaced by any alternative and that as such a sense of collective identity was being lost.

Other scholars disagreed with Melton's idea; in 2004 Daren Kemp stated that "New Age is still very much alive". Hammer himself stated that "the New Age movement may be on the wane, but the wider New Age religiosity... shows no sign of disappearing". MacKian suggested that the New Age "movement" had been replaced by a wider "New Age sentiment" which had come to pervade "the socio-cultural landscape" of Western countries. Its diffusion into the mainstream may have been influenced by the adoption of New Age concepts by high-profile figures: U.S. First Lady Nancy Reagan consulted an astrologer, British Princess Diana visited spirit mediums, and Norwegian Princess Märtha Louise established a school devoted to communicating with angels. New Age shops continued to operate, although many have been remarketed as "Mind, Body, Spirit".

In 2015, the scholar of religion Hugh Urban argued that New Age spirituality is growing in the United States and can be expected to become more visible: "According to many recent surveys of religious affiliation, the 'spiritual but not religious' category is one of the fastest-growing trends in American culture, so the New Age attitude of spiritual individualism and eclecticism may well be an increasingly visible one in the decades to come".

Australian scholar Paul J. Farrelly, in his 2017 doctoral dissertation at Australian National University, argued that, while the term New Age may become less popular in the West, it is actually booming in Taiwan, where it is regarded as something comparatively new and is being exported from Taiwan to the Mainland China, where it is more or less tolerated by the authorities.

== Beliefs and practices ==
=== Eclecticism and self-spirituality ===
The New Age places strong emphasis on the idea that the individual and their own experiences are the primary source of authority on spiritual matters. It exhibits what Heelas termed "unmediated individualism", and reflects a world-view that is "radically democratic". It places an emphasis on the freedom and autonomy of the individual. This emphasis has led to ethical disagreements; some New Agers believe helping others is beneficial, although another view is that doing so encourages dependency and conflicts with a reliance on the self. Nevertheless, within the New Age, there are differences in the role accorded to voices of authority outside of the self. Hammer stated that "a belief in the existence of a core or true Self" is a "recurring theme" in New Age texts. The concept of "personal growth" is also greatly emphasised among New Agers, while Heelas noted that "for participants spirituality is life-itself".

New Age religiosity is typified by its eclecticism. Generally believing that there is no one true way to pursue spirituality, New Agers develop their own worldview "by combining bits and pieces to form their own individual mix", seeking what Drury called "a spirituality without borders or confining dogmas". The anthropologist David J. Hess noted that in his experience, a common attitude among New Agers was that "any alternative spiritual path is good because it is spiritual and alternative". This approach that has generated a common jibe that New Age represents "supermarket spirituality". York suggested that this eclecticism stemmed from the New Age's origins within late modern capitalism, with New Agers subscribing to a belief in a free market of spiritual ideas as a parallel to a free market in economics.

As part of its eclecticism, the New Age draws ideas from many different cultural and spiritual traditions from across the world, often legitimising this approach by reference to "a very vague claim" about underlying global unity. Certain societies are more usually chosen over others; examples include the ancient Celts, ancient Egyptians, the Essenes, Atlanteans, and ancient extraterrestrials. As noted by Hammer: "to put it bluntly, no significant spokespersons within the New Age community claim to represent ancient Albanian wisdom, simply because beliefs regarding ancient Albanians are not part of our cultural stereotypes". According to Hess, these ancient or foreign societies represent an exotic "Other" for New Agers, who are predominantly white Westerners.

=== Theology, cosmogony, and cosmology ===
A belief in divinity is integral to New Age ideas, although understandings of this divinity vary. New Age theology exhibits an inclusive and universalistic approach that accepts all personal perspectives on the divine as equally valid. This intentional vagueness as to the nature of divinity also reflects the New Age idea that divinity cannot be comprehended by the human mind or language. New Age literature nevertheless displays recurring traits in its depiction of the divine: the first is the idea that it is holistic, thus frequently being described with such terms as an "Ocean of Oneness", "Infinite Spirit", "Primal Stream", "One Essence", and "Universal Principle". A second trait is the characterisation of divinity as "Mind", "Consciousness", and "Intelligence", while a third is the description of divinity as a form of "energy". A fourth trait is the characterisation of divinity as a "life force", the essence of which is creativity, while a fifth is the concept that divinity consists of love.

Most New Age groups believe in an Ultimate Source from which all things originate, which is usually conflated with the divine. Various creation myths have been articulated in New Age publications outlining how this Ultimate Source created the universe and everything in it. In contrast, some New Agers emphasize the idea of a universal inter-relatedness that is not always emanating from a single source. The New Age worldview emphasises holism and the idea that everything in existence is intricately connected as part of a single whole, in doing so rejecting both the dualism of the Christian division of matter and spirit and the reductionism of Cartesian science. A number of New Agers have linked this holistic interpretation of the universe to the Gaia hypothesis of James Lovelock. The idea of holistic divinity results in a common New Age belief that humans themselves are divine in essence, a concept described using such terms as "droplet of divinity", "inner Godhead", and "divine self". Influenced by Theosophical and Anthroposophical ideas regarding 'subtle bodies', a common New Age idea holds to the existence of a Higher Self that is a part of the human but connects with the divine essence of the universe, and which can advise the human mind through intuition.

Cosmogonical creation stories are common in New Age sources, with these accounts reflecting the movement's holistic framework by describing an original, primal oneness from which all things in the universe emanated. An additional common theme is that human souls—once living in a spiritual world—then descended into a world of matter. The New Age movement typically views the material universe as a meaningful illusion, which humans should try to use constructively rather than focus on escaping into other spiritual realms. This physical world is hence seen as "a domain for learning and growth" after which the human soul might pass on to higher levels of existence. There is thus a widespread belief that reality is engaged in an ongoing process of evolution; rather than Darwinian evolution, this is typically seen as either a teleological evolution which assumes a process headed to a specific goal or an open-ended, creative evolution.

=== Spirit and channeling ===
In the flood of channeled material which has been published or delivered to "live" audiences in the last two decades, there is much indeed that is trivial, contradictory, and confusing. The authors of much of this material make claims that, while not necessarily untrue or fraudulent, are difficult or impossible for the reader to verify. A number of other channeled documents address issues more immediately relevant to the human condition. The best of these writings are not only coherent and plausible, but eloquently persuasive and sometimes disarmingly moving.

— Academic Suzanne Riordan, 1992.

A conduit, in esoterism, and spiritual discourse, is a specific object, person, location, or process (such as engaging in a séance or entering a trance, or using psychedelic medicines) which allows a person to connect or communicate with a spiritual realm, metaphysical energy, or spiritual entity, or vice versa. The use of such a conduit may be entirely metaphoric or symbolic, or it may be earnestly believed to be functional.

MacKian argued that a central, but often overlooked, element of the phenomenon was an emphasis on "spirit", and in particular participants' desire for a relationship with spirit. Many practitioners in her UK-focused study described themselves as "workers for spirit", expressing the desire to help people learn about spirit. They understood various material signs as marking the presence of spirit, for instance, the unexpected appearance of a feather. New Agers often call upon this spirit to assist them in everyday situations, for instance, to ease the traffic flow on their way to work.

New Age literature often refers to benevolent non-human spirit-beings who are interested in humanity's spiritual development; these are variously referred to as angels, guardian angels, personal guides, masters, teachers, and contacts. New Age angelology is nevertheless unsystematic, reflecting the idiosyncrasies of individual authors. The figure of Jesus Christ is often mentioned within New Age literature as a mediating principle between divinity and humanity, as well as an exemplar of a spiritually advanced human being.

Although not present in every New Age group, a core belief within the milieu is in channeling. This is the idea that humans beings, sometimes (although not always) in a state of trance, can act "as a channel of information from sources other than their normal selves". These sources are varyingly described as being God, gods and goddesses, ascended masters, spirit guides, extraterrestrials, angels, devas, historical figures, the collective unconscious, elementals, or nature spirits. Hanegraaff described channeling as a form of "articulated revelation", and identified four forms: trance channeling, automatisms, clairaudient channeling, and open channeling.

A notable channeler in the early 1900s was Rose Edith Kelly, wife of the English occultist and ceremonial magician Aleister Crowley (1875–1947). She allegedly channeled the voice of a non-physical entity named Aiwass during their honeymoon in Cairo, Egypt (1904). Others purport to channel spirits from "future dimensions", ascended masters, or, in the case of the trance mediums of the Brahma Kumaris, God. Another channeler in the early 1900s was Edgar Cayce, who said that he was able to channel his higher self while in a trance-like state.

In the later half of the 20th century, Western mediumship developed in two different ways. One type involves clairaudience, in which the medium is said to hear spirits and relay what they hear to their clients. The other is a form of channeling in which the channeler seemingly goes into a trance, and purports to leave their body allowing a spirit entity to borrow it and then speak through them. When in a trance the medium appears to enter into a cataleptic state, although modern channelers may not. Some channelers open the eyes when channeling, and remain able to walk and behave normally. The rhythm and the intonation of the voice may also change completely.

Examples of New Age channeling include Jane Roberts' belief that she was contacted by an entity called Seth, and Helen Schucman's belief that she had channeled Jesus Christ. The academic Suzanne Riordan examined a variety of these New Age channeled messages, noting that they typically "echoed each other in tone and content", offering an analysis of the human condition and giving instructions or advice for how humanity can discover its true destiny. For many New Agers, these channeled messages rival the scriptures of the main world religions as sources of spiritual authority, although often New Agers describe historical religious revelations as forms of "channeling" as well, thus attempting to legitimate and authenticate their own contemporary practices. Although the concept of channeling from discarnate spirit entities has links to Spiritualism and psychical research, the New Age does not feature Spiritualism's emphasis on proving the existence of life after death, nor psychical research's focus of testing mediums for consistency.

Other New Age channels include:

- J. Z. Knight (b. 1946), who channels the spirit "Ramtha", a 30-thousand-year-old man from Lemuria
- Esther Hicks (b. 1948), who channels a purported collective consciousness she calls "Abraham"
- Gary Douglas of Access Consciousness, who purportedly channels Grigori Rasputin, aliens called Novian, a 14th-century monk named Brother George, and an ancient Chinese man called Tchia Tsin.

=== Astrological cycles and the Age of Aquarius ===
New Age thought typically envisions the world as developing through cosmological cycles that can be identified astrologically. It adopts this concept from Theosophy, although often presents it in a looser and more eclectic way than is found in Theosophical teaching. New Age literature often proposes that humanity once lived in an age of spiritual wisdom. In the writings of New Agers like Edgar Cayce, the ancient period of spiritual wisdom is associated with concepts of supremely-advanced societies living on lost continents such as Atlantis, Lemuria, and Mu, as well as the idea that ancient societies like those of Ancient Egypt were far more technologically advanced than modern scholarship accepts. New Age literature often posits that the ancient period of spiritual wisdom gave way to an age of spiritual decline, sometimes termed the Age of Pisces. Although characterised as being a negative period for humanity, New Age literature views the Age of Pisces as an important learning experience for the species. Hanegraaff stated that New Age perceptions of history were "extremely sketchy" in their use of description, reflecting little interest in historiography and conflating history with myth. He also noted that they were highly ethnocentric in placing Western civilization at the centre of historical development.

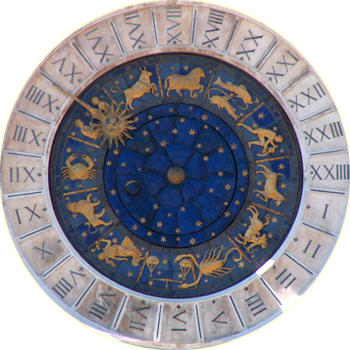
Astrological ideas hold a central place in the New Age.

A common belief among the New Age is that humanity has entered, or is coming to enter, a new period known as the Age of Aquarius, which Melton has characterised as a "New Age of love, joy, peace, abundance, and harmony[...] the Golden Age heretofore only dreamed about." In accepting this belief in a coming new age, the milieu has been described as "highly positive, celebratory, [and] utopian", and has also been cited as an apocalyptic movement. Opinions about the nature of the coming Age of Aquarius differ among New Agers. There are for instance differences in belief about its commencement; New Age author David Spangler wrote that it began in 1967, others placed its beginning with the Harmonic Convergence of 1987, author José Argüelles predicted its start in 2012, and some believe that it will not begin until several centuries into the third millennium.

There are also differences in how this new age is envisioned. Those adhering to what Hanegraaff termed the "moderate" perspective believed that it would be marked by an improvement to current society, which affected both New Age concerns—through the convergence of science and mysticism and the global embrace of alternative medicine—to more general concerns, including an end to violence, crime and war, a healthier environment, and international co-operation. Other New Agers adopt a fully utopian vision, believing that the world will be wholly transformed into an "Age of Light", with humans evolving into totally spiritual beings and experiencing unlimited love, bliss, and happiness. Rather than conceiving of the Age of Aquarius as an indefinite period, many believe that it would last for around two thousand years before being replaced by a further age.

There are various beliefs within the milieu as to how this new age will come about, but most emphasise the idea that it will be established through human agency; others assert that it will be established with the aid of non-human forces such as spirits or extraterrestrials. Ferguson, for instance, said that there was a vanguard of humans known as the "Aquarian conspiracy" who were helping to bring the Age of Aquarius forth through their actions. Participants in the New Age typically express the view that their own spiritual actions are helping to bring about the Age of Aquarius, with writers like Ferguson and Argüelles presenting themselves as prophets ushering forth this future era.

=== Healing and alternative medicine ===
Another recurring element of New Age is an emphasis on healing and alternative medicine. The general New Age ethos is that health is the natural state for the human being and that illness is a disruption of that natural balance. Hence, New Age therapies seek to heal "illness" as a general concept that includes physical, mental, and spiritual aspects; in doing so it critiques mainstream Western medicine for simply attempting to cure disease, and thus has an affinity with most forms of traditional medicine. Its focus of self-spirituality has led to the emphasis of self-healing, although also present are ideas on healing both others and the Earth itself.

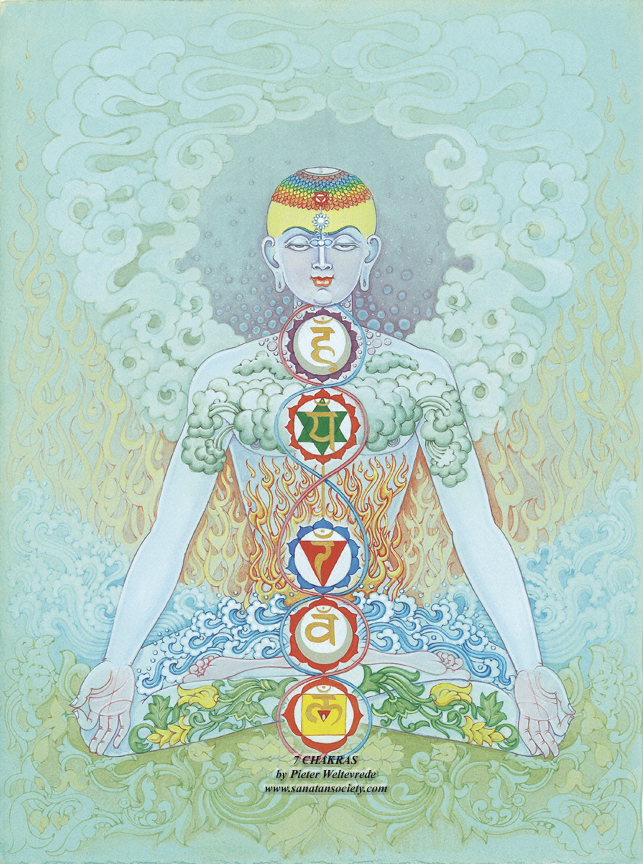
Reiki is one of the alternative therapies commonly found in the New Age movement.

The healing elements of the movement are difficult to classify given that a variety of terms are used, with some New Age authors using different terms to refer to the same trends, while others use the same term to refer to different things. However, Hanegraaff developed a set of categories into which the forms of New Age healing could be roughly categorised. The first of these was the Human Potential Movement, which argues that contemporary Western society suppresses much human potential, and accordingly professes to offer a path through which individuals can access those parts of themselves that they have alienated and suppressed, thus enabling them to reach their full potential and live a meaningful life. Hanegraaff described transpersonal psychology as the "theoretical wing" of this Human Potential Movement; in contrast to other schools of psychological thought, transpersonal psychology takes religious and mystical experiences seriously by exploring the uses of altered states of consciousness. Closely connected to this is the shamanic consciousness current, which argues that the shaman was a specialist in altered states of consciousness and seeks to adopt and imitate traditional shamanic techniques as a form of personal healing and growth.

Hanegraaff identified the second main healing current in the New Age movement as being holistic health. This emerged in the 1970s out of the free clinic movement of the 1960s, and has various connections with the Human Potential Movement. It emphasises the idea that the human individual is a holistic, interdependent relationship between mind, body, and spirit, and that healing is a process in which an individual becomes whole by integrating with the powers of the universe. A very wide array of methods are utilised within the holistic health movement, with some of the most common including acupuncture, reiki, biofeedback, chiropractic, yoga, applied kinesiology, homeopathy, aromatherapy, iridology, massage and other forms of bodywork, meditation and visualisation, nutritional therapy, psychic healing, herbal medicine, healing using crystals, metals, music, chromotherapy, and reincarnation therapy. Although the use of crystal healing has become a visual trope within the New Age, this practice was not common in esotericism prior to their adoption in the New Age milieu. The mainstreaming of the Holistic Health movement in the UK is discussed by Maria Tighe. The inter-relation of holistic health with the New Age movement is illustrated in Jenny Butler's ethnographic description of "Angel therapy" in Ireland.

=== New Age science ===
The New Age is essentially about the search for spiritual and philosophical perspectives that will help transform humanity and the world. New Agers are willing to absorb wisdom teachings wherever they can find them, whether from an Indian guru, a renegade Christian priest, an itinerant Buddhist monk, an experiential psychotherapist or a Native American shaman. They are eager to explore their own inner potential with a view to becoming part of a broader process of social transformation. Their journey is towards totality of being.

— Nevill Drury

According to Drury, the New Age attempts to create "a worldview that includes both science and spirituality", while Hess noted how New Agers have "a penchant for bringing together the technical and the spiritual, the scientific and the religious". Although New Agers typically reject rationalism, the scientific method, and the academic establishment, they employ terminology and concepts borrowed from science and particularly from new physics. Moreover, a number of influences on New Age, such as David Bohm and Ilya Prigogine, had backgrounds as professional scientists. Hanegraaff identified "New Age science" as a form of Naturphilosophie.

In this, the milieu is interested in developing unified world views to discover the nature of the divine and establish a scientific basis for religious belief. Figures in the New Age movement—most notably Fritjof Capra in his The Tao of Physics (1975) and Gary Zukav in The Dancing Wu Li Masters (1979)—have drawn parallels between theories in the New Physics and traditional forms of mysticism, thus arguing that ancient religious ideas are now being proven by contemporary science. Many New Agers have adopted James Lovelock's Gaia hypothesis that the Earth acts akin to a single living organism, going further to propound that the Earth has a consciousness and intelligence.

Despite New Agers' appeals to science, most of the academic and scientific establishments dismiss "New Age science" as pseudo-science, or at best existing in part on the fringes of genuine scientific research. This is an attitude also shared by many active in the field of parapsychology. In turn, New Agers often accuse the scientific establishment of pursuing a dogmatic and outmoded approach to scientific enquiry, believing that their own understandings of the universe will replace those of the academic establishment in a paradigm shift.

Wendy Kaminer stated "New Age has always relied on pseudoscience". Massimo Introvigne agrees: "a classic feature of New Age".

=== Ethics and afterlife ===
There is no ethical cohesion within the New Age phenomenon, although Hanegraaff argued that the central ethical tenet of the New Age is to cultivate one's own divine potential. Given that the movement's holistic interpretation of the universe prohibits a belief in a dualistic good and evil, negative events that happen are interpreted not as the result of evil but as lessons designed to teach an individual and enable them to advance spiritually. It rejects the Christian emphasis on sin and guilt, believing that these generate fear and thus negativity, which in turn hinder spiritual evolution. It also typically criticises the blaming and judging of others for their actions, believing that if an individual adopts these negative attitudes it harms their own spiritual evolution. Instead, the movement emphasizes positive thinking, although beliefs regarding the power behind such thoughts vary within New Age literature. Common New Age examples of how to generate such positive thinking include the repeated recitation of mantras and statements carrying positive messages, and the visualisation of a white light.

According to Hanegraaff, the question of death and afterlife is not a "pressing problem requiring an answer" in the New Age. A belief in reincarnation is very common, where it is often viewed as being part of an individual's progressive spiritual evolution toward realisation of their own divinity. In New Age literature, the reality of reincarnation is usually treated as self-evident, with no explanation as to why practitioners embrace this afterlife belief over others, although New Agers endorse it in the belief that it ensures cosmic justice. Many New Agers believe in karma, treating it as a law of cause and effect that assures cosmic balance, although in some cases they stress that it is not a system that enforces punishment for past actions. Much New Age literature on reincarnation says that part of the human soul, that which carries the personality, perishes with the death of the body, while the Higher Self—that which connects with divinity—survives in order to be reborn into another body. It is believed that the Higher Self chooses the body and circumstances into which it will be born, in order to use it as a vessel through which to learn new lessons and thus advance its own spiritual evolution. New Age writers like Shakti Gawain and Louise Hay therefore express the view that humans are responsible for the events that happen to them during their life, an idea that many New Agers regard as empowering. At times, past life regression are employed within the New Age in order to reveal a Higher Soul's previous incarnations, usually with an explicit healing purpose. Some practitioners espouse the idea of a "soul group" or "soul family", a group of connected souls who reincarnate together as family of friendship units. Rather than reincarnation, another afterlife belief found among New Agers holds that an individual's soul returns to a "universal energy" on bodily death.

== Demographics ==
By the early twenty-first century... [the New Age phenomenon] has an almost entirely white, middle-class demography largely made up of professional, managerial, arts, and entrepreneurial occupations.

— Religious studies scholar Steven J. Sutcliffe.

In the mid-1990s, the New Age was found primarily in the United States and Canada, Western Europe, and Australia and New Zealand. The fact that most individuals engaging in New Age activity do not describe themselves as "New Agers" renders it difficult to determine the total number of practitioners. Heelas highlighted the range of attempts to establish the number of New Age participants in the U.S. during this period, noting that estimates ranged from 20,000 to 6 million; he believed that the higher ranges of these estimates were greatly inflated by, for instance, an erroneous assumption that all Americans who believed in reincarnation were part of the New Age. He nevertheless suggested that over 10 million people in the U.S. had had some contact with New Age practices or ideas. Between 2000 and 2002, Heelas and Woodhead conducted research into the New Age in the English town of Kendal, Cumbria; they found 600 people actively attended New Age activities on a weekly basis, representing 1.6% of the town's population. From this, they extrapolated that around 900,000 Britons regularly took part in New Age activities. In 2006, Heelas stated that New Age practices had grown to such an extent that they were "increasingly rivaling the sway of Christianity in Western settings".

Sociological investigation indicates that certain sectors of society are more likely to engage in New Age practices than others. In the United States, the first people to embrace the New Age belonged to the baby boomer generation, those born between 1946 and 1964.

Sutcliffe noted that although most influential New Age figureheads were male, approximately two-thirds of its participants were female. Heelas and Woodhead's Kendal Project found that of those regularly attending New Age activities in the town, 80% were female, while 78% of those running such activities were female. They attributed this female dominance to "deeply entrenched cultural values and divisions of labour" in Western society, according to which women were accorded greater responsibility for the well-being of others, thus making New Age practices more attractive to them. They suggested that men were less attracted to New Age activities because they were hampered by a "masculinist ideal of autonomy and self-sufficiency" which discouraged them from seeking the assistance of others for their inner development.

The majority of New Agers are from the middle and upper-middle classes of Western society. Heelas and Woodhead found that of the active Kendal New Agers, 57% had a university or college degree. Their Kendal Project also determined that 73% of active New Agers were aged over 45, and 55% were aged between 40 and 59; it also determined that many got involved while middle-aged. Comparatively few were either young or elderly. Heelas and Woodhead suggested that the dominance of middle-aged people, particularly women, was because at this stage of life they had greater time to devote to their own inner development, with their time previously having been dominated by raising children. They also suggested that middle-aged people were experiencing more age-related ailments than the young, and thus more keen to pursue New Age activities to improve their health.

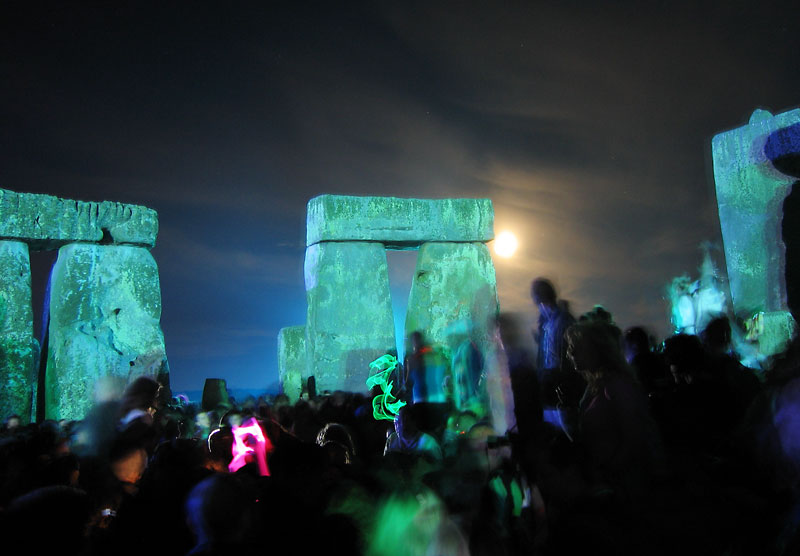
Stonehenge is a site visited by New Age pilgrims, as seen in this midsummer rave.

Heelas added that within the baby boomers, the movement had nevertheless attracted a diverse clientele. He typified the typical New Ager as someone who was well-educated yet disenchanted with mainstream society, thus arguing that the movement catered to those who believe that modernity is in crisis. He suggested that the movement appealed to many former practitioners of the 1960s counter-culture because while they came to feel that they were unable to change society, they were nonetheless interested in changing the self. He believed that many individuals had been "culturally primed for what the New Age has to offer", with the New Age attracting "expressive" people who were already comfortable with the ideals and outlooks of the movement's self-spirituality focus. It could be particularly appealing because the New Age suited the needs of the individual, whereas traditional religious options that are available primarily catered for the needs of a community. He believed that although the adoption of New Age beliefs and practices by some fitted the model of religious conversion, others who adopted some of its practices could not easily be considered to have converted to the religion. Sutcliffe described the "typical" participant in the New Age milieu as being "a religious individualist, mixing and matching cultural resources in an animated spiritual quest".

The degree to which individuals are involved in the New Age varies. Heelas argued that those involved could be divided into three broad groups; the first comprised those who were completely dedicated to it and its ideals, often working in professions that furthered those goals. The second consisted of "serious part-timers" who worked in unrelated fields but who nevertheless spent much of their free time involved in movement activities. The third was that of "casual part-timers" who occasionally involved themselves in New Age activities but for whom the movement was not a central aspect of their life. MacKian instead suggested that involvement could be seen as being layered like an onion; at the core are "consultative" practitioners who devote their life to New Age practices, around that are "serious" practitioners who still invest considerable effort into New Age activities, and on the periphery are "non-practitioner consumers", individuals affected by the general dissemination of New Age ideas but who do not devote themselves more fully to them. Many New Age practices have filtered into wider Western society, with a 2000 poll, for instance, revealing that 39% of the UK population had tried alternative therapies.

In 1995, Kyle stated that on the whole, New Agers in the United States preferred the values of the Democratic Party over those of the Republican Party. He added that most New Agers "soundly rejected" the agenda of former Republican President Ronald Reagan.

=== Social communities ===
MacKian suggested that this phenomenon was "an inherently social mode of spirituality", one which cultivated a sense of belonging among its participants and encouraged relations both with other humans and with non-human, otherworldly spirit entities. MacKian suggested that these communities "may look very different" from those of traditional religious groups.

Online connections were one of the ways that interested individuals met new contacts and established networks.

== Commercial aspects ==
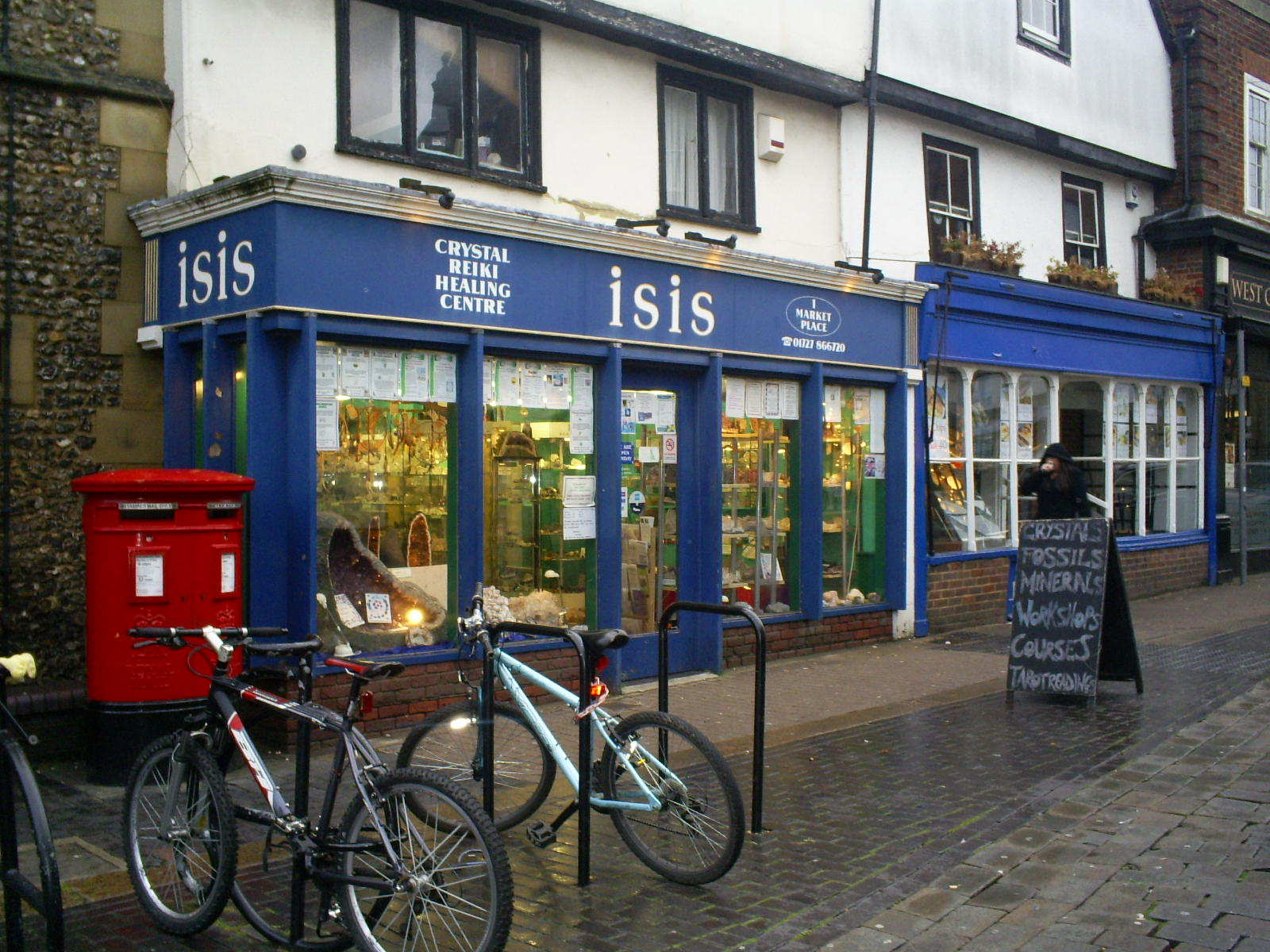
Isis, a New Age shop named after the Ancient Egyptian goddess that was located in St Albans, southern England

Some New Agers advocate living in a simple and sustainable manner to reduce humanity's impact on the natural resources of Earth; and they shun consumerism. The New Age movement has been centered around rebuilding a sense of community to counter social disintegration; this has been attempted through the formation of intentional communities, where individuals come together to live and work in a communal lifestyle. New Age centres have been set up in various parts of the world, representing an institutionalised form of the movement. Notable examples include the Naropa Institute in Boulder, Colorado, Holly Hock Farm near to Vancouver, the Wrekin Trust in West Malvern, Worcestershire, and the Skyros Centre in Skyros. Criticising mainstream Western education as counterproductive to the ethos of the movement, many New Age groups have established their own schools for the education of children, although in other cases such groups have sought to introduce New Age spiritual techniques into pre-existing establishments.

Bruce argued that in seeking to "denying the validity of externally imposed controls and privileging the divine within", the New Age sought to dismantle pre-existing social order, but that it failed to present anything adequate in its place. Heelas, however, cautioned that Bruce had arrived at this conclusion based on "flimsy evidence", and Aldred argued that only a minority of New Agers participate in community-focused activities; instead, she argued, the majority of New Agers participate mainly through the purchase of books and products targeted at the New Age market, positioning New Age as a primarily consumerist and commercial movement.

=== Fairs and festivals ===
New Age spirituality has led to a wide array of literature on the subject and an active niche market, with books, music, crafts, and services in alternative medicine available at New Age stores, fairs, and festivals. New Age fairs—sometimes known as "Mind, Body, Spirit fairs", "psychic fairs", or "alternative health fairs"—are spaces in which a variety of goods and services are displayed by different vendors, including forms of alternative medicine and esoteric practices such as palmistry or tarot card reading. An example is the Mind Body Spirit Festival, held annually in the United Kingdom, at which—the religious studies scholar Christopher Partridge noted—one could encounter "a wide range of beliefs and practices from crystal healing to ... Kirlian photography to psychic art, from angels to past-life therapy, from Theosophy to UFO religion, and from New Age music to the vegetarianism of Suma Chign Hai." Similar festivals are held across Europe and in Australia and the United States.

=== Approaches to financial prosperity and business ===
A number of New Age proponents have emphasised the use of spiritual techniques as a tool for attaining financial prosperity, thus moving the movement away from its counter-cultural origins. Commenting on this "New Age capitalism", Hess observed that it was largely small-scale and entrepreneurial, focused around small companies run by members of the petite bourgeoisie, rather than being dominated by large scale multinational corporations. The links between New Age and commercial products have resulted in the accusation that New Age itself is little more than a manifestation of consumerism. This idea is generally rejected by New Age participants, who often reject any link between their practices and consumerist activities.

Embracing this attitude, various books have been published espousing such an ethos, established New Age centres have held spiritual retreats and classes aimed specifically at business people, and New Age groups have developed specialised training for businesses. During the 1980s, many U.S. corporations—among them IBM, AT&T, and General Motors—embraced New Age seminars, hoping that they could increase productivity and efficiency among their workforce, although in several cases this resulted in employees bringing legal action against their employers, saying that such seminars had infringed on their religious beliefs or damaged their psychological health. However, the use of spiritual techniques as a method for attaining profit has been an issue of major dispute within the wider New Age movement, with New Agers such as Spangler and Matthew Fox criticising what they see as trends within the community that are narcissistic and lack a social conscience. In particular, the movement's commercial elements have caused problems given that they often conflict with its general economically egalitarian ethos; as York highlighted, "a tension exists in New Age between socialistic egalitarianism and capitalistic private enterprise".

Given that it encourages individuals to choose spiritual practices on the grounds of personal preference and thus encourages them to behave as a consumer, the New Age has been considered to be well suited to modern society.

=== Music ===
The term "new-age music" is applied, sometimes negatively, to forms of ambient music, a genre that developed in the 1960s and was popularised in the 1970s, particularly with the work of Brian Eno. The genre's relaxing nature resulted in it becoming popular within New Age circles, with some forms of the genre having a specifically New Age orientation. Studies have determined that new-age music can be an effective component of stress management.

The style began in the late 1960s and early 1970s with the works of free-form jazz groups recording on the ECM label; such as Oregon, the Paul Winter Consort, and other pre-ambient bands; as well as ambient music performer Brian Eno, classical avant-garde musician Daniel Kobialka, and the psychoacoustic environments recordings of Irv Teibel. In the early 1970s, it was mostly instrumental with both acoustic and electronic styles. New-age music evolved to include a wide range of styles from electronic space music using synthesizers and acoustic instrumentals using Native American flutes and drums, singing bowls, Australian didgeridoos and world music sounds to spiritual chanting from other cultures.

== Politics ==
While many commentators have focused on the spiritual and cultural aspects of the New Age movement, it also has a political component. The New Age political movement became visible in the 1970s, peaked in the 1980s, and continued into the 1990s. The sociologist of religion Steven Bruce noted that the New Age provides ideas on how to deal with "our socio-psychological problems". Scholar of religion James R. Lewis observed that, despite the common caricature of New Agers as narcissistic, "significant numbers" of them were "trying to make the planet a better place on which to live," and scholar J. Gordon Melton's New Age Encyclopedia (1990) included an entry called "New Age politics". Some New Agers have entered the political system in an attempt to advocate for the societal transformation that the New Age promotes.

=== Ideas ===
Although New Age activists have been motivated by New Age concepts like holism, interconnectedness, monism, and environmentalism, their political ideas are diverse, ranging from far-right and conservative through to liberal, socialist, and libertarian. Accordingly, Kyle stated that "New Age politics is difficult to describe and categorize. The standard political labels—left or right, liberal or conservative—miss the mark." MacKian suggested that the New Age operated as a form of "world-realigning infrapolitics" that undermines the disenchantment of modern Western society.

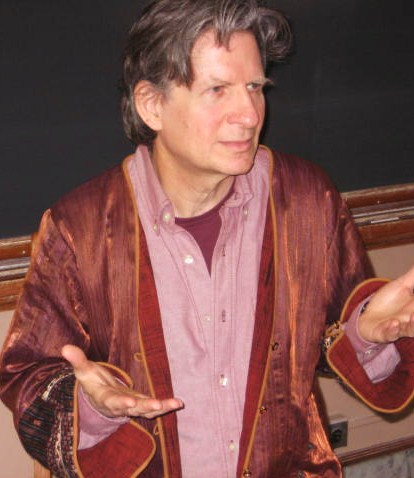
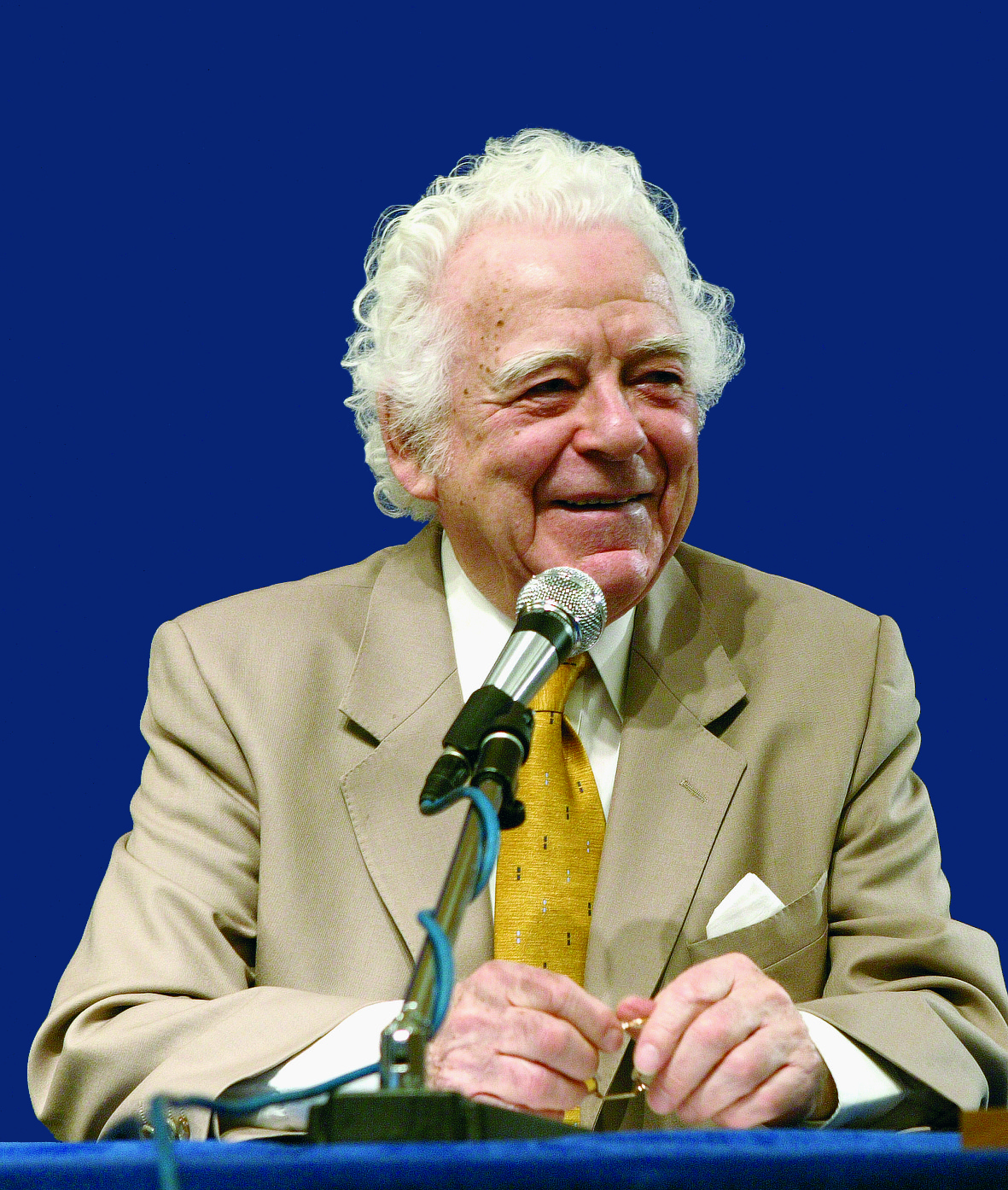
Writers who have espoused political ideas influenced by New Age perspectives included Mark Satin (left) and Benjamin Creme (right).

The extent to which New Age spokespeople mix religion and politics varies. New Agers are often critical of the established political order, regarding it as "fragmented, unjust, hierarchical, patriarchal, and obsolete". The New Ager Mark Satin for instance spoke of "New Age politics" as a politically radical "third force" that was "neither left nor right". He believed that in contrast to the conventional political focus on the "institutional and economic symptoms" of society's problems, his "New Age politics" would focus on "psychocultural roots" of these issues. Ferguson regarded New Age politics as "a kind of Radical Centre", one that was "not neutral, not middle-of-the-road, but a view of the whole road." Fritjof Capra argued that Western societies have become sclerotic because of their adherence to an outdated and mechanistic view of reality, which he calls the Newtonian/Cartesian paradigm. In Capra's view, the West needs to develop an organic and ecological "systems view" of reality in order to successfully address its social and political issues. Corinne McLaughlin argued that politics need not connote endless power struggles, that a new "spiritual politics" could attempt to synthesize opposing views on issues into higher levels of understanding.

Many New Agers advocate globalisation and localisation, but reject nationalism and the role of the nation-state. Some New Age spokespeople have called for greater decentralisation and global unity, but are vague about how this might be achieved; others call for a global, centralised government. Satin for example argued for a move away from the nation-state and towards self-governing regions that, through improved global communication networks, would help engender world unity. Benjamin Creme conversely argued that "the Christ", a great Avatar, Maitreya, the World Teacher, expected by all the major religions as their "Awaited One", would return to the world and establish a strong, centralised global government in the form of the United Nations; this would be politically re-organised along a spiritual hierarchy. Kyle observed that New Agers often speak favourably of democracy and citizens' involvement in policy making but are critical of representative democracy and majority rule, thus displaying elitist ideas to their thinking.

=== Groups ===
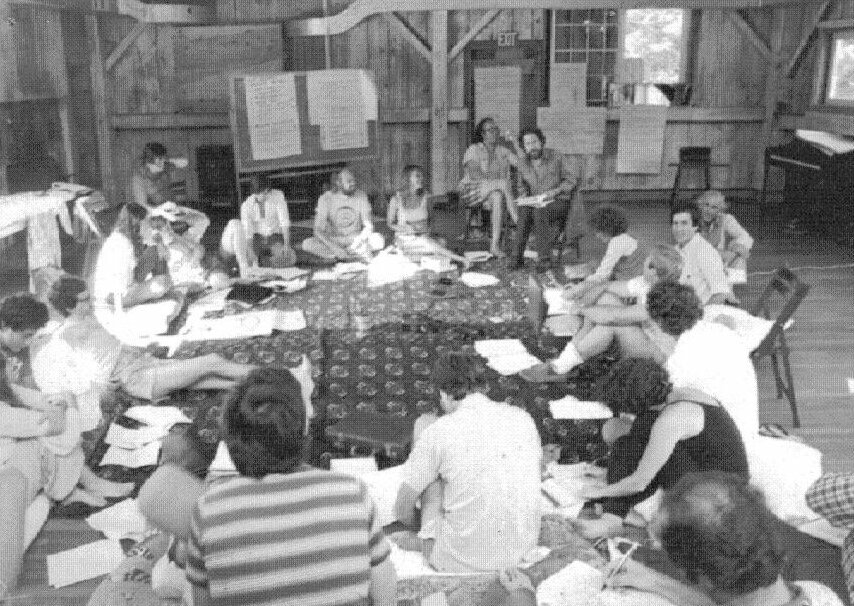
The New World Alliance was one of several New Age political groups in the 1970s and 1980s.

Scholars have noted several New Age political groups. Self-Determination: A Personal/Political Network, lauded by Ferguson and Satin, was described at length by sociology of religion scholar Steven Tipton. Founded in 1975 by California state legislator John Vasconcellos and others, it encouraged Californians to engage in personal growth work and political activities at the same time, especially at the grassroots level. Hanegraaff noted another California-based group, the Institute of Noetic Sciences, headed by the author Willis Harman. It advocated a change in consciousness—in "basic underlying assumptions"—in order to come to grips with global crises. Kyle said that the New York City–based Planetary Citizens organization, headed by United Nations consultant and Earth at Omega author Donald Keys, sought to implement New Age political ideas.

Scholar J. Gordon Melton and colleagues focused on the New World Alliance, a Washington, DC–based organization founded in 1979 by Mark Satin and others. According to Melton et al., the Alliance tried to combine left- and right-wing ideas as well as personal growth work and political activities. Group decision-making was facilitated by short periods of silence. Sponsors of the Alliance's national political newsletter included Willis Harman and John Vasconcellos. Scholar James R. Lewis counted "Green politics" as one of the New Age's more visible activities. One academic book says that the U.S. Green Party movement began as an initiative of a handful of activists including Charlene Spretnak, co-author of a "'new age' interpretation" of the German Green movement (Capra and Spretnak's Green Politics), and Mark Satin, author of New Age Politics. Another academic publication says Spretnak and Satin largely co-drafted the U.S. Greens' founding document, the "Ten Key Values" statement.

=== In the 21st century ===
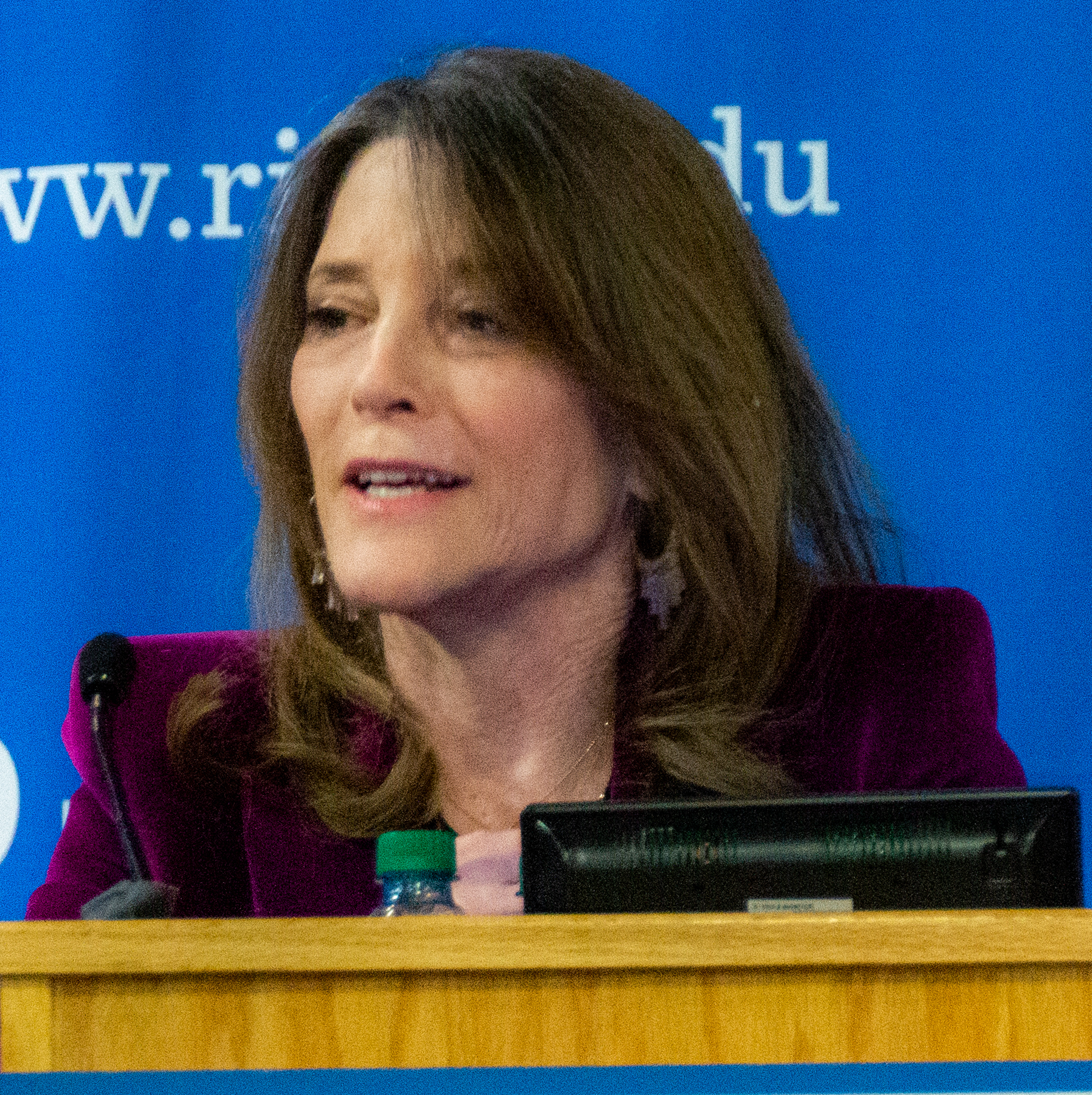
New Age author Marianne Williamson campaigned for a seat in the U.S. Congress and for the Democratic Party nomination for president.

While the term New Age may have fallen out of favor, scholar George Chryssides notes that the New Age by whatever name is "still alive and active" in the 21st century. In the realm of politics, New Ager Mark Satin's book Radical Middle (2004) reached out to mainstream liberals. York (2005) identified "key New Age spokespeople" including William Bloom, Satish Kumar, and Starhawk who were emphasizing a link between spirituality and environmental consciousness. Former Esalen Institute staffer Stephen Dinan's Sacred America, Sacred World (2016) prompted a long interview of Dinan in Psychology Today, which called the book a "manifesto for our country's evolution that is both political and deeply spiritual".

In 2013 longtime New Age author Marianne Williamson launched a campaign for a seat in the United States House of Representatives, telling The New York Times that her type of spirituality was what American politics needed. "America has swerved from its ethical center", she said. Running as an independent in west Los Angeles, she finished fourth in her district's open primary election with 13% of the vote. In early 2019, Williamson announced her candidacy for the Democratic Party nomination for president of the United States in the 2020 United States presidential election. A 5,300-word article about her presidential campaign in The Washington Post said she had "plans to fix America with love. Tough love". In January 2020 she withdrew her bid for the nomination. She ran for the Presidency again beginning in March 2023, but ended her bid in July 2024.

In the 2020s, several longtime New Age political thinkers and activists wrote books attempting to draw lessons from their experiences. Among them: Far Out Man: Tales of Life in the Counterculture, by New Age Journal co-founder and Utne Reader founder Eric Utne; Up From Socialism: My 60-Year Search for a Healing New Radical Politics, by New Age Politics author and New World Alliance co-founder Mark Satin; and From Vision to Action: Remaking the World Through Social Entrepreneurship, by Search for Common Ground founder John D. Marks.

== Reception ==
=== Popular media ===
Mainstream periodicals tended to be less than sympathetic; sociologist Paul Ray and psychologist Sherry Anderson discussed in their 2000 book The Cultural Creatives, what they called the media's "zest for attacking" New Age ideas, and offered the example of a 1996 Lance Morrow essay in Time magazine. Nearly a decade earlier, Time had run a long cover story critical of New Age culture; the cover featured a headshot of a famous actress beside the headline, "Om.... THE NEW AGE starring Shirley MacLaine, faith healers, channelers, space travelers, and crystals galore". The story itself, by former Saturday Evening Post editor Otto Friedrich, was sub-titled, "A Strange Mix of Spirituality and Superstition Is Sweeping Across the Country". In 1988, the magazine The New Republic ran a four-page critique of New Age culture and politics by a journalist Richard Blow entitled simply, "Moronic Convergence".

Some New Agers and New Age sympathizers responded to such criticisms. For example, sympathizers Ray and Anderson said that much of it was an attempt to "stereotype" the movement for idealistic and spiritual change, and to cut back on its popularity. New Age theoretician David Spangler tried to distance himself from what he called the "New Age glamour" of crystals, talk-show channelers, and other easily commercialized phenomena, and sought to underscore his commitment to the New Age as a vision of genuine social transformation.

=== Academia ===
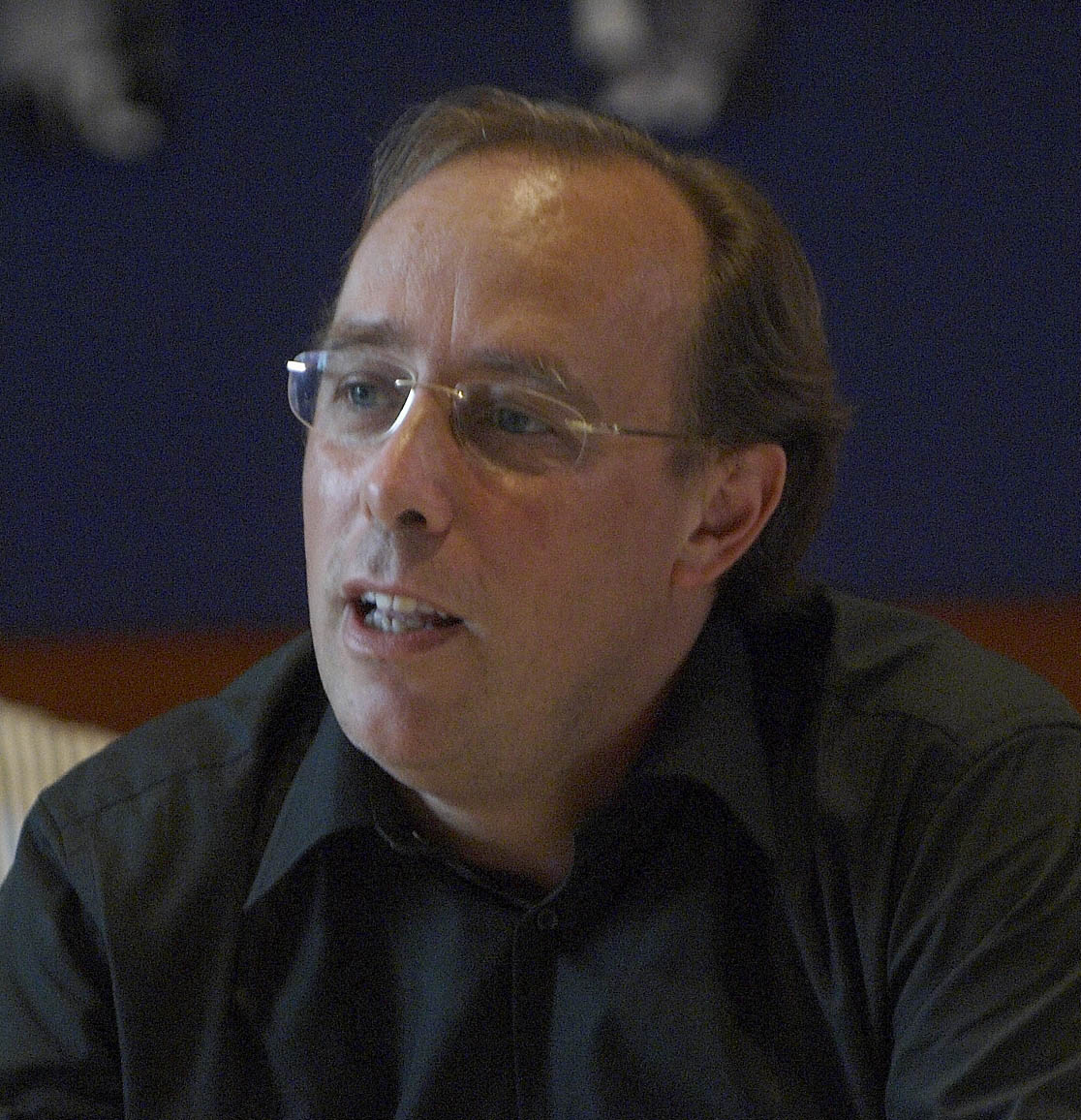
One of the first academics to study the New Age was Wouter Hanegraaff.

Initially, academic interest in the New Age was minimal. The earliest academic studies of the New Age phenomenon were performed by specialists in the study of new religious movements such as Robert Ellwood. This research was often scanty because many scholars regarded the New Age as an insignificant cultural fad. Having been influenced by the U.S. anti-cult movement, much of it was also largely negative and critical of New Age groups. The "first truly scholarly study" of the phenomenon was an edited volume put together by James R. Lewis and J. Gordon Melton in 1992. From that point on, the number of published academic studies steadily increased.

In 1994, Christoph Bochinger published his study of the New Age in Germany, "New Age" und moderne Religion. This was followed by Michael York's sociological study in 1995 and Richard Kyle's U.S.-focused work in 1995. In 1996, Paul Heelas published a sociological study of the movement in Britain, being the first to discuss its relationship with business. That same year, Wouter Hanegraaff published New Age Religion and Western Culture, a historical analysis of New Age texts; Hammer later described it as having "a well-deserved reputation as the standard reference work on the New Age". Most of these early studies were based on a textual analysis of New Age publications, rather than on an ethnographic analysis of its practitioners.

Sutcliffe and Gilhus argued that 'New Age studies' could be seen as having experienced two waves; in the first, scholars focused on "macro-level analyses of the content and boundaries" of the "movement", while the second wave featured "more variegated and contextualized studies of particular beliefs and practices". Sutcliffe and Gilhus have also expressed concern that, as of 2013, 'New Age studies' has yet to formulate a set of research questions scholars can pursue. The New Age has proved a challenge for scholars of religion operating under more formative models of what "religion" is. By 2006, Heelas noted that the New Age was so vast and diverse that no scholar of the subject could hope to keep up with all of it.

=== Christian perspectives ===
Mainstream Christianity has typically rejected the ideas of the New Age; Christian critiques often emphasise that the New Age places the human individual before God. Most published criticism of the New Age has been produced by Christians, particularly those on the religion's fundamentalist wing. In the United States, the New Age became a major concern of evangelical Christian groups in the 1980s, an attitude that influenced British evangelical groups. During that decade, evangelical writers such as Constance Cumbey, Dave Hunt, Gary North, and Douglas Groothuis published books criticising the New Age; a number propagated conspiracy theories regarding its origin and purpose. The most successful such publication was Frank E. Peretti's 1986 novel This Present Darkness, which sold over a million copies; it depicted the New Age as being in league with feminism and secular education as part of a conspiracy to overthrow Christianity. Similarly, Pat Robertson's influential 1991 book The New World Order characterized the New Age movement as part of an overarching satanic conspiracy to establish a New World Order. Modern Christian critics of the New Age include Doreen Virtue, a former New Age writer from California who converted to fundamentalist Christianity in 2017.

Official responses to the New Age have been produced by major Christian organisations like the Roman Catholic Church, the Church of England, and the Methodist Church. The Roman Catholic Church published A Christian reflection on the New Age in 2003, following a six-year study; the 90-page document criticizes New Age practices such as yoga, meditation, feng shui, and crystal healing. According to the Vatican, euphoric states attained through New Age practices should not be confused with prayer or viewed as signs of God's presence. Cardinal Paul Poupard, then-president of the Pontifical Council for Culture, said the New Age is "a misleading answer to the oldest hopes of man". Monsignor Michael Fitzgerald, then-president of the Pontifical Council for Interreligious Dialogue, stated at the Vatican conference on the document: the "Church avoids any concept that is close to those of the New Age". On the contrary, some fringe Christian groups have adopted a more positive view of the New Age, among them the Christaquarians, and Christians Awakening to a New Awareness, all of which believe that New Age ideas can enhance a person's Christian faith.

=== Comparison with contemporary paganism ===
Neopagan practices highlight the centrality of the relationship between humans and nature and reinvent religions of the past, while New Agers are more interested in transforming individual consciousness and shaping the future.

— Religious studies scholar Sarah Pike.

There is academic debate about the connection between the New Age and Modern Paganism, sometimes termed "Neo-paganism". The two phenomena have often been confused and conflated, particularly in Christian critiques. Religious studies scholar Sarah Pike asserted that there was a "significant overlap" between the two religious movements, while Aidan A. Kelly stated that Paganism "parallels the New Age movement in some ways, differs sharply from it in others, and overlaps it in some minor ways". Other scholars have identified them as distinct phenomena that share overlap and commonalities. Hanegraaff suggested that whereas various forms of contemporary Paganism were not part of the New Age movement—particularly those that pre-dated the movement—other Pagan religions and practices could be identified as New Age. Partridge portrayed both Paganism and the New Age as different streams of occulture (occult culture) that merge at points.

Various differences between the two movements have been highlighted; the New Age movement focuses on an improved future, whereas the focus of Paganism is on the pre-Christian past. Similarly, the New Age movement typically propounds a universalist message that sees all religions as fundamentally the same, whereas Paganism stresses the difference between monotheistic religions and those embracing a polytheistic or animistic theology. While the New Age emphasises a light-centred image, Paganism acknowledges both light and dark, life and death, and recognises the savage side of the natural world. Many Pagans have sought to distance themselves from the New Age movement, even using "New Age" as an insult within their community, while conversely many involved in the New Age have expressed criticism of Paganism for emphasizing the material world over the spiritual. Many Pagans have expressed criticism of the high fees charged by New Age teachers, something not typically present in the Pagan movement.

=== Non-Western and Indigenous criticism ===
New Age often adopts spiritual ideas and practices from other, particularly non-Western cultures. According to York, these may include "Hawaiian Kahuna magic, Australian Aboriginal dream-working, South American Amerindian ayahuasca and San Pedro ceremonies, Hindu Ayurveda and yoga, Chinese Feng Shui, Qi Gong, and Tai Chi."

The New Age has been accused of cultural imperialism, misappropriating sacred ceremonies, and exploitation of the intellectual and cultural property of Indigenous peoples. Indigenous American spiritual leaders, such as Elders councils of the Lakota, Cheyenne, Navajo, Creek, Hopi, Chippewa, and Haudenosaunee have denounced New Age misappropriation of their sacred ceremonies and other intellectual property, stating that "[t]he value of these instructions and ceremonies [when led by unauthorized people] are questionable, maybe meaningless, and hurtful to the individual carrying false messages". Traditional leaders of the Lakota, Dakota, and Nakota peoples have reached consensus to reject "the expropriation of [their] ceremonial ways by non-Indians". They see the New Age movement as either not fully understanding, deliberately trivializing, or distorting their way of life, and strongly disapprove of all such "plastic medicine people" who are appropriating their spiritual ways.

Indigenous leaders have spoken out against individuals from within their own communities who may go out into the world to become a "white man's shaman", and any "who are prostituting our spiritual ways for their own selfish gain, with no regard for the spiritual well-being of the people as a whole". The terms "plastic shaman" and "plastic medicine person" have been used to describe an outsider who identifies or promotes themselves as a shaman, holy person, or other traditional spiritual leader, yet has no genuine connection to the traditions or cultures represented.

=== Political writers and activists ===
New Age politics might be seen not as a wayward, pathological creature of the New Left's imagination, but as a political innocent in candid, questioning dialogue with the unclaimed mainstream territory of progressive, rather than atomistic, individualism. Indeed, if we were to examine some of the social and political threads that run through the aery fabric of New Age thinking, we would find certain themes that resonate with the necessary conditions for a left version of progressive individualism. Generally speaking, New Age addresses its adherents as active participants, with a measure of control over their everyday lives. ... The New Age "person" is also in many respects an individual whose personal growth is indissociable from the environment; a link fleshed out in a variety of ecotopian stories and romances. So, too, the small-scale imperative of New Age's cooperative communitarianism brings with it a host of potentially critical positions. ...

— Scholar of cultural studies Andrew Ross, 1991

Toward the end of the 20th century, some social and political analysts and activists were arguing that the New Age political perspective had something to offer mainstream society. In 1987, some political scientists launched the "Section on Ecological and Transformational Politics" of the American Political Science Association, and an academic book prepared by three of them stated that the "transformational politics" concept was meant to subsume such terms as new age and new paradigm. In 1991, scholar of cultural studies Andrew Ross suggested that New Age political ideas—however muddled and naïve—could help progressives construct an appealing alternative to both atomistic individualism and self-denying collectivism. In 2005, British researcher Stuart Rose urged scholars of alternative religions to pay more attention to the New Age's interest in such topics as "new socio-political thinking" and "New Economics", topics Rose discussed in his book Transforming the World: Bringing the New Age Into Focus, issued by a European academic publisher.

Other political thinkers and activists saw New Age politics less positively. On the political right, author George Weigel argued that New Age politics was just a retooled and pastel-colored version of leftism. Conservative evangelical writer Douglas Groothuis, discussed by scholars Hexham and Kemp, warned that New Age politics could lead to an oppressive world government. On the left, scholars argued that New Age politics was an oxymoron: that personal growth has little or nothing to do with political change. One political scientist said New Age politics fails to recognize the reality of economic and political power. Another communication academic, Dana L. Cloud, wrote a lengthy critique of New Age politics as a political ideology; she faulted it for not being opposed to the capitalist system, or to liberal individualism.

A criticism of New Age often made by leftists is that its focus on individualism deflects participants from engaging in socio-political activism. This perspective regards New Age as a manifestation of consumerism that promotes elitism and indulgence by allowing wealthier people to affirm their socio-economic status through consuming New Age products and therapies. New Agers who do engage in socio-political activism have also been criticized. Journalist Harvey Wasserman suggested that New Age activists were too averse to social conflict to be effective politically. Melton et al. found that New Age activists' commitment to the often frustrating process of consensus decision-making led to "extended meetings and minimal results", and a pair of futurists concluded that one once-promising New Age activist group had been both "too visionary and too vague" to last.

== See also ==
- Higher consciousness
- Hypnosis
- Mindfulness
- New Age communities
- New religious movement
- Nonviolent resistance
- Peace movement
- Philosophy of happiness
- Post-scarcity
- Postchristianity
- Roerichism
- Social theory
