= Therapeutic touch =

Pseudoscientific energy therapy

Alternative therapy
- MeSH: D019124

Therapeutic touch (TT), or non-contact therapeutic touch (NCTT), also generically called healing touch, is a pseudoscientific energy therapy which practitioners claim promotes healing and reduces pain and anxiety. "Therapeutic Touch" is a registered trademark in Canada for the "[s]tructured and standardized healing practice performed by practitioners trained to be sensitive to the receiver's energy field that surrounds the body;...no touching is required."

Practitioners of therapeutic touch state that by placing their hands on, or near, a patient, they are able to detect and manipulate what they say is the patient's energy field. One highly cited study, designed by the then-nine-year-old Emily Rosa and published in the Journal of the American Medical Association in 1998, found that practitioners of therapeutic touch could not detect the presence or absence of a hand placed a few inches above theirs when their vision was obstructed. Simon Singh and Edzard Ernst concluded in their 2008 book Trick or Treatment that "the energy field was probably nothing more than a figment in the imaginations of the healers". The American Cancer Society noted, "Available scientific evidence does not support any claims that TT can cure cancer or other diseases." A 2004 Cochrane review found no good evidence that it helped with wound healing, but the authors withdrew it in 2016 out of "serious concerns over the validity of included studies".

== Origin and foundations ==
Dora Kunz, a theosophy promoter and one-time president (1975–1987) of the Theosophical Society in America, and Dolores Krieger, now Professor Emerita of Nursing Science, New York University, developed therapeutic touch in the 1970s. According to Krieger, therapeutic touch has roots in ancient healing practices, such as the laying on of hands, although it has no connection with religion or with faith healing. Krieger states that, "in the final analysis, it is the healee (client) who heals himself. The healer or therapist, in this view, acts as a human energy support system until the healee's own immunological system is robust enough to take over."

Justification for TT has been sought in two fields: Martha E. Rogers' contemporal "Science of Unitary Human Beings", and quantum mechanics, in particular Fritjof Capra's mystical interpretation of the latter. A 2002 review found that neither justification was tenable: Rogers's theories were found to be inconsistent with the tenets of TT, while the overlap in terminology between the two could be ascribed to a lack of precision in Rogers's works, making them multi-interpretable. The quantum physics justification holds that the possibility to heal at a distance is made possible by a "global interconnectivity" of the universe, which TT adherents ascribe to an interpretation of Bell's theorem and the possibility of quantum nonlocality; this interpretation is not supported by experimental evidence. The 2002 study concluded that "the theory TT possesses is deprived of explanatory power" and "evidence that supports the current picture of physical energy should be regarded as evidence against the theory of TT".

The supposed healing in TT takes place through a discredited physical process called "electron transfer resonance", which the physicist Alan Sokal describes as "nonsense."

== Scientific investigations ==
Over the decades, many clinical studies have been performed to investigate TT's efficacy, as well as various meta-analyses and at least one systematic review, yielding varying results and conclusions. O'Mathúna et al., in discussing these studies, note several problems, such as failure to exclude methodologically flawed studies and a susceptibility to the publication bias of complementary medicine journals, which carry a "preponderance of studies with positive results"; they argue that

in light of background scientific knowledge, the antecedent plausibility of TT is sufficiently low that any methodological flaw in a study will always provide a more plausible explanation for any positive findings.

— O'Mathúna et al.

Emily Rosa, at nine years of age, conceived and executed a study on therapeutic touch. With the help of Quackwatch's Stephen Barrett and the assistance of her mother, Linda Rosa, and her step-father, Larry Sarner, Emily became the youngest researcher to have a paper accepted by the Journal of the American Medical Association (JAMA), which debunked the claim of therapeutic touch practitioners that they can reliably sense a "Human Energy Field." Twenty-one practitioners of therapeutic touch participated in her study. The practitioners sat on one side of a cardboard screen, while Emily sat on the other. The practitioners then placed their hands through holes in the screen. Emily flipped a coin to determine which of each practitioner's hands she would place hers over (approximately 4-5 inches above the subject's hand). The practitioners then were to say where her hand was by sensing her biofield. Although all of the participants had asserted that they would be able to do this, the actual results did not support therapeutic touch's fundamental claim. The practitioners had succeeded in locating Emily's hand 44% of the time, a rate lower than, though within the range of, mere chance. The JAMA editor George D. Lundberg, M.D, recommended that third-party payers and the public should question paying for this procedure "until or unless additional honest experimentation demonstrates an actual effect."

There is no good medical evidence for the effectiveness of therapeutic touch. A Cochrane systematic review, first published in 2004, found "[t]here is no robust evidence that TT promotes healing of acute wounds", but in 2016, the authors retracted it after the validity of the reviewed studies was questioned. The American Cancer Society notes, "Available scientific evidence does not support any claims that TT can cure cancer or other diseases."

== Skeptical view of therapeutic touch ==
In examinations of the existing literature on therapeutic touch, it has been observed that these studies tend only to cite research that favours the desired findings. There have been studies focused on therapeutic touch that have failed to include any research that has contradictory findings, despite their obligation to report it. Some studies, have also lacked appropriate controls, and so have appeared at first glance to show the effectiveness of therapeutic touch, yet have returned nonsignificant results when replicated; this is the case with the Grad, Cadoret, and Paul study.

Researcher bias has been found in studies examining therapeutic touch. A study on therapeutic touch by Wirth, in which more than half of the subjects being treated by this therapy had healed by day 16, with no healing shown in the control group, appeared successful. However, closer examination reveals that there were several trials conducted, that only two of the five trials were successful, and that the control group healed as well or better than the treatment group in the other three trials. Similarly, Turner declared that a successful result of his work would provide "the first real scientific evidence there is for therapeutic touch," suggesting bias. Much such research has also failed to be replicated.

== Therapeutic touch and nursing education ==
Sokal, in 2006, reported generally accepted estimates of over 80 colleges and universities spread over 70 countries where therapeutic touch is taught, as well as some 80 hospitals in North America where it is practiced. He added that "these figures should be taken with a grain of salt, since both advocates and detractors [...] have an interest in exaggerating its incidence".

Owen Hammer and James Underdown of the Independent Investigations Group examined nursing standards in California, where the California Board of Registered Nursing can award registered nurses taking classes in therapeutic touch with continuing education units required for licensure renewal. In 2006, Hammer and Underdown presented the board with the scientific evidence refuting the validity of therapeutic touch as a legitimate treatment, but the board did not change its policy.

== See also ==
- List of ineffective cancer treatments
- List of topics characterized as pseudoscience
- Royal Commission on Animal Magnetism
- Royal touch
- Energy medicine
- Faith healing
- Laying on of hands
- Reiki
- Access Consciousness
