= Access Consciousness =

Pseudoscientific system of alternative medicine and New Age beliefs

Alternative medicine
- Access Bars
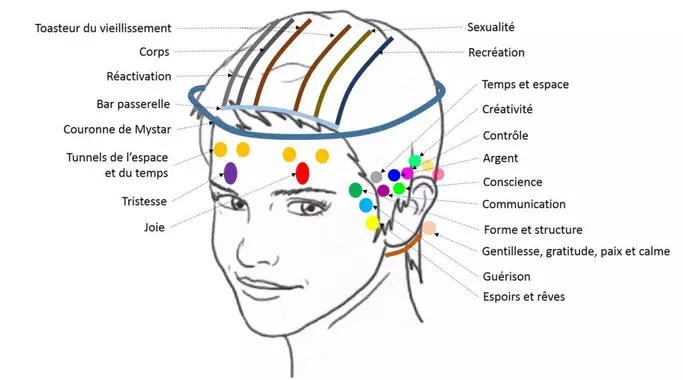
- Mapping of Access Bars
- Claims: improved mental, financial, and physical health
- Original proponents: Gary Douglas

Access Consciousness is a pseudoscientific New Age movement founded by Gary Douglas in 1990 in Santa Barbara, California, initially called Access Energy Transformation. After a failed real estate business and subsequent bankruptcy in 1993, Douglas claimed to begin channeling spirits, including Russian mystic Grigori Rasputin, from whom he learned about "Access Bars" which are points on the head purported to help with energy, health, and wealth. As of 2024, the practice has since evolved into a global movement, offering a range of self-help and energy healing techniques. Access Consciousness promotes a mix of energy therapy, elements of phrenology, and prosperity gospel principles, with practitioners claiming to "run the bars" to manipulate energy fields for various life improvements. The organization has faced significant criticism, with skeptics denouncing its practices as pseudoscientific, and allegations of abuse, cult-like behavior, and exploitation have surfaced over the years.

== History ==
After filing for bankruptcy in 1993 due to a failed real estate venture and briefly working for the United Way, Gary Douglas founded Access Consciousness, initially named Access Energy Transformation, in Santa Barbara, California, in 1990.

Douglas allegedly started channeling spirits in the early 1990s after witnessing a channeler at work in the late 1980s. He claimed to channel Grigori Rasputin, whom he called "Raz", for many years and apparently learned from the Russian about Access Bars, which are points on the head that are supposed to aid in energy, health, and wealth. Douglas also claims to have channeled an ancient Chinese man named Tchia Tsin, aliens from another world called Novian, and a 14th-century monk named Brother George. Douglas stated that the aliens abducted him when he was six years old, implanting a chip. He noted that channeling aliens was more painful than channeling the others but that they protect him.

In 2001, Dain Heer, a former chiropractor, joined the movement, moving in with Douglas and becoming second in command. In 2003, Australian Simone Milasas was hired and as of 2024 is the worldwide business coordinator for the organization. Milasas is the developer of the Access Consciousness courses.

Access Consciousness appeared in France in 2010 and has been growing in popularity. In 2020, it was available in 170 countries around the world. As of 2021 there were 150 Access Consciousness facilitators in eight Canadian Provinces.

== Description ==
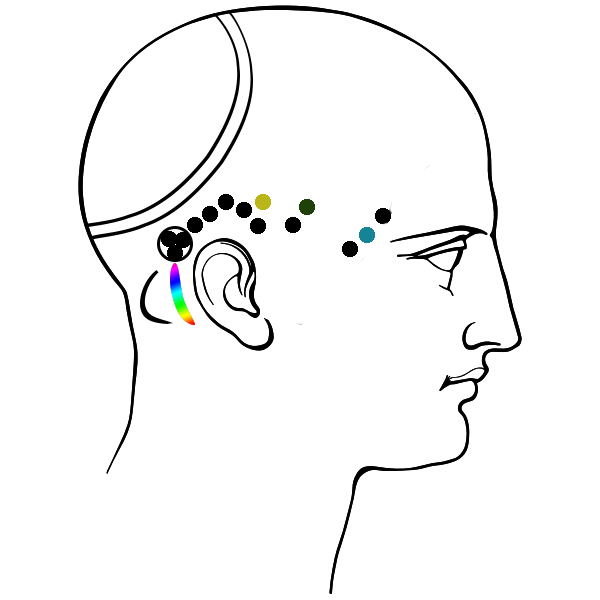
AB head side

Access Consciousness is a New Age therapy that is described as a combination of phrenology and energy therapies such as reiki and Therapeutic touch that have their origins in Traditional Chinese medicinal Tui na. It also incorporates elements of the prosperity gospel. The leaders claim that there are 32 Access Bars, or points on the head that relate to the ancient Chinese meridian lines but in this system erroneously represent such things as creativity, gratitude, memories, emotions, and money. The bars are touched lightly similar to acupressure by a practitioner, who manipulates energy fields, purporting to aid in achieving clearer thoughts, more energy, disposing of negative energy, better health, and more wealth. The practice of touching these points on the head is referred to as "running the bars."

A goal of Access Consciousness practices is to transition from a human to a humanoid. A human is someone who judges others and a humanoid is someone who judges themselves and looks for ways to make life better. Humanoids are purported to be able to "bend the universe," choose their future, talk to molecules, regenerate body parts, change the weather, and survive on sugar and water alone.

Incorporated within the Access Consciousness doctrine is a clearing statement, which is to be said, like a mantra, throughout the day. The statement is, "Right and Wrong, Good and Bad, POD and POC, All 9, Shorts, Boys and Beyonds." The clearing statement purports to rid the person of negative energy.

Paragraph from the 1996 Access Consciousness manual

What are the RRRs for the SAS for suppressing anger and confrontation as the MPII of linearities through the AEA of consciousness as the eradication of simultaneity in all realities, relationships, BHCEEMCs and destruct universes? Right, Wrong, Good, Bad, POD, POC, All 9, shorts, boys, and beyonds.

— McGill Office for Science and Society

Proponents attempt to "live in 10-second increments," and eschew the use of drugs, including recreational drugs such as alcohol and marijuana, and psychiatric medications such as those used for depression, anxiety, and ADHD. These drugs are said to allow entities to enter the body.

Facilitators declare they can communicate with horses via telepathy. They also assert to be able to remove bad entities that have entered a horse's body. This can be done remotely or in person for a fee. In 2011, 300 believers from Access Consciousness traveled to the Great Pacific Garbage Patch to help speed up the breakdown of the garbage by using "energy and Molecular Demanifestation," with no success. According to a 2015 manual, a good partner is described as one that lets you do whatever you want and "...is good in bed." Believers are counselled to report on other members and to call their enemies and threaten them by repeating three times, "If you do this again, I will kill you."

Proponents of Access Consciousness claim that there are studies that prove the therapy's effectiveness. Science communicator Jonathan Jarry, in his article titled Rasputin, Phrenology, and Dark Allegations: The Madness of Access Consciousness, states that these studies are poor. One study done by psychologist Jeffrey Fannin used electrodes to show that if a patient is lying down for an hour with their scalp gently massaged, they are relaxed. Jarry counters that this state of relaxation can also be achieved with a nap that doesn't cost money.

The leaders of Access Consciousness fly in private jets and own multiple properties worldwide. On October 6, 2020, Milasas was seen at a class using a silver bullion bar as a door stop.

=== Training and certification ===
To become a practitioner you need one day of training. Subsequent training to become a facilitator includes a minimum of twelve courses, in addition to regular teleconferences. Continuous training is required annually. There are over eight thousand tools to learn. The cost in 2024 for this training was AUD 30,000, with a licence renewal costing AUD 17,000. As of 2024, there were approximately 3,000 licensed facilitators.

A former facilitator, Kerry Purcell, reported that she would spend AUD 60,000 on travel and fees for Access Consciousness courses. She invested AUD 150,000 in what she thought was Milasas' bottled water business but later believed it was used to pay off Milasas' personal debts, which Milasas claimed were paid off because of her positive energy.

Some practitioners teach communicating with animals.

== Criticisms and controversies ==
Critics have referred to Access Consciousness as a milder version of Scientology. Douglas is familiar with the church as he was a Scientologist himself. His first wife, Laurie Alexander, was an auditor for the church and his second wife, Mary Wernicke, was a former Scientologist.

According to medical doctor David Gorski in an article called Access Consciousness: Phrenology fused with energy medicine, there is no good evidence that Access Consciousness has "...any relationship to biology, medicine, neuroscience, or psychology—or even just to anatomy." While Heer has advertised Access Consciousness on multiple World Suicide Prevention Days, Jarry says that "Mental health problems should not be solved with expensive magical thinking."

In 2024, former members of Access Consciousness filed a complaint with the Australian Competition & Consumer Commission alleging that false claims were made regarding the therapies, and that the organization is a pyramid or multi-level marketing scheme.

Multiple former members have also shared that they were publicly shamed and verbally abused for attempting to speak up about the issues of the movement.

=== Sexual abuse ===
Douglas purports to be able to bring women to orgasm by lightly touching the bars on a woman's head. He has also been accused of being verbally abusive towards women and children in workshops and training sessions. Heer has been accused of grooming women and children attending workshops to have sexual relations with him, with one woman claiming that he asked her to send nude pictures to him.

Douglas claims that children are sexy in a humanoid, not human way. Children can attend sessions for free or at a reduced rate. According to the Level One March 2012 manual, molested children "allowed" the abuse to happen to them so it would not happen to others.

=== Use in social work ===
In 2018, Nova Scotian social worker Eileen Carey, who was practicing Access Consciousness, had her licence permanently revoked for inappropriate touching and contact outside the office. The patient, who spent thousands of dollars on courses, and who filed the complaint, was invited to Carey's home to perform "energy trades" where they would alternate receiving the Access Bars on a massage table, calling each other "energy buddies." In addition, Carey had to pay CAD 15,000 to cover the investigation costs.

In 2019, the Journal of Evidence-Informed Social Work discovered that Access Consciousness was being advertised by over 400 social workers in the United States.

== See also ==
- Eye movement desensitization and reprocessing
- List of topics characterized as pseudoscience
- Energy medicine
- Faith healing
- Therapeutic touch
