= Emily Rosa =

American skeptic (born 1987)

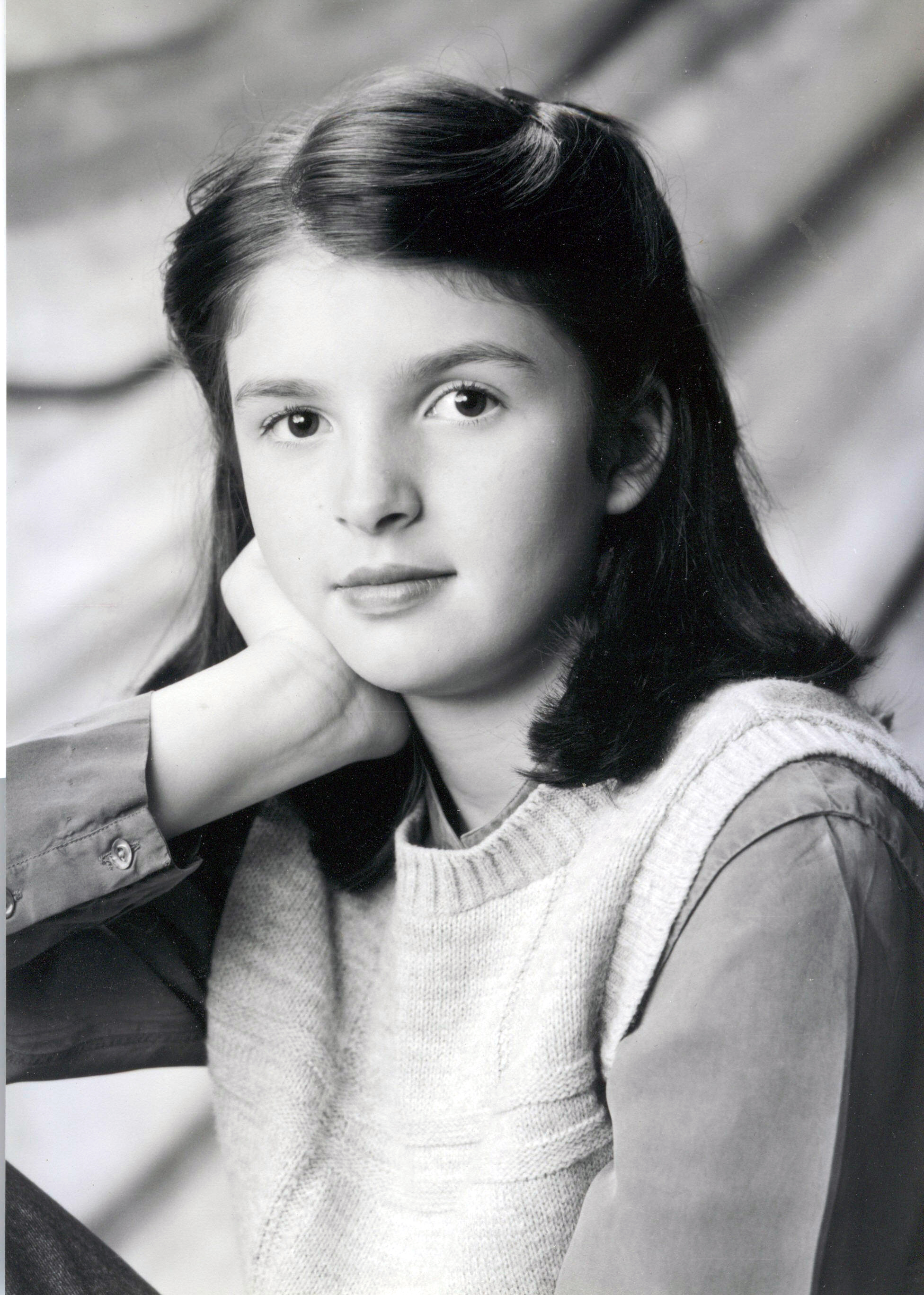
- Age 11 in 1998
- Born: February 6, 1987 (age 39); Loveland, Colorado
- Occupations: Psychologist, scientist
- Parent(s): Linda Rosa, Larry Sarner

Emily Rosa (born February 6, 1987) is the youngest person to have a research paper published in a peer-reviewed medical journal. At age nine, Rosa conceived and executed a scientific study of therapeutic touch, which was published in the Journal of the American Medical Association in 1998. She graduated from the University of Colorado at Denver in 2009 with a major in psychology. Her parents, Larry Sarner and Linda Rosa, are leaders of the advocacy group Advocates for Children in Therapy.

== Therapeutic Touch study ==
In 1996, Rosa saw a video of Therapeutic Touch (TT) practitioners claiming they could feel a "Human Energy Field" (HEF) emanating from a human body and could use their hands to manipulate the HEF in order to diagnose and treat disease. She heard Dolores Krieger, the co-inventor of Therapeutic Touch, claim that everyone had the ability to feel the HEF, and Rosa heard other nurses say the HEF felt to them "warm as Jell-O" and "tactile as taffy." Rosa was impressed by how certain these nurses were about their abilities. She said, "I wanted to see if they really could feel something."

Using a standard science fair display board, Rosa devised a single-blind protocol, later described by other scientists as "simple and elegant", for a study she conducted at age nine for her 4th grade science fair. There were two series of tests. In 1996, 15 practitioners were tested at their home or office on different days over a period of several months. In 1997, 13 practitioners, including 7 from the first series, were tested on a single day. The second series was observed and videotaped by the producers of Scientific American Frontiers. Stephen Barrett, MD, of Quackwatch was senior author, her mother (Linda Rosa, RN) was lead author, and her stepfather (Larry Sarner) served as statistician when the experiment was written up for the Journal of the American Medical Association. The study, which included an extensive literature search, was published on April 1, 1998. George Lundberg, editor of JAMA, aware of the uniqueness of the situation, said: "Age doesn't matter. It's good science that matters, and this is good science".

The study tested the ability of 21 TT practitioners to detect the HEF when they were not looking. Rosa asked each of the practitioners to sit at a table and extend their hands through a screen. On the other side of the screen, Rosa randomly selected one of the TT practitioners' hands and held her own hand over it. The TT practitioners were then asked which of their hands detected Rosa's HEF. Subjects were each given ten tries, but they correctly located Rosa's hand an average of only 4.4 times. Some subjects were asked before testing to examine Rosa's hands and select which of her hands they thought produced the strongest HEF. Rosa then used that hand during the experiment, but those subjects performed no better. The results showed that TT practitioners could not detect the hand more often than chance, and Rosa and her co-authors therefore concluded that there was no empirical basis to the HEF and by extension therapeutic touch:

To our knowledge, no other objective, quantitative study involving more than a few TT practitioners has been published, and no well-designed study demonstrates any health benefit from TT. These facts, together with our experimental findings, suggest that TT claims are groundless and that further use of TT by health professionals is unjustified.

=== Reaction ===
Publication of Rosa's experiment in JAMA was an international media sensation. In an article in The New York Times, Rosa was likened to the child in the short tale "The Emperor's New Clothes". The article noted that Rosa's parents and helpers on the project were Linda Rosa, a registered nurse who had been campaigning against TT for nearly a decade, and Larry Sarner, chairman of the National Therapeutic Touch Study Group, an anti-TT organization.

David Hufford claimed that the study presented ethical problems because the authors of the study enlisted the cooperation of the TT operators by presenting the study as just a "fourth grade science fair project." Hufford wrote that this was failure of full disclosure and deceit. But Hufford's analysis did not acknowledge that the first round of tests was, in fact, only a fourth grade science fair project done with no thought of future publication. Publication was suggested by Dr. Stephen Barrett months afterward when he learned that the study had taken place. The second round of tests was done at the request of Scientific American Frontiers, with the participants fully aware that they were being videotaped. No subsequent experiment has been undertaken overturning her findings. However, one published study clarified some of the issues that were raised at the time in parts of the skeptical community about the method and analysis of the data. Specifically, that study found that people should be expected to detect the presence of a hand at better than chance levels, most likely due to radiant heat because interposing heat blocking materials reduced accuracy to chance levels.

== Awards ==
=== Therapeutic Touch experiment ===
- 1999: Recognition by Guinness Book of World Records (ISBN 1-892051-01-X) as the youngest person to have research published in a scientific or medical journal.

=== Other work ===
- 2000: Colorado Science and Engineering Fair: 1st Place, Junior Division Earth & Space Sciences, for Geodesy: Measuring the Circumference of the Earth with Original Instruments.
- 2003: Atheist Alliance International: "The Future of Free Thought" Award.

== Appearances ==
- ABC, CBS, NBC and PBS evening news; John Stossel specials; BBC, Fox, CNN, MSNBC; Nick News; Brazil Idea; I've Got a Secret; Denver TV; Scientific American Frontiers (three programs); Discovery Channel (two programs); ABC radio; and NPR's All Things Considered.
- Keynoted the 1998 Ig Nobel Ceremonies at Harvard, and accepted the Award in Science Education for an absent Dolores Krieger, who "could not or would not attend" herself. Krieger, a nursing professor and co-inventor of Therapeutic Touch, was cited "for demonstrating the merits of therapeutic touch, a method by which nurses manipulate the energy fields of ailing patients by carefully avoiding physical contact with those patients." In her keynote, Rosa expressed her gratitude that Dr. Krieger had, for two decades, left basic research in TT for her to do. The next day, Rosa delivered an "Ig Nobel" Address at MIT.
- Stossel, John (October 6, 1998). "The Power of Belief". ABC News.
- "New Age Medicine". Penn & Teller: Bullshit! 2008.

== Publications ==
- L Rosa, E Rosa, L Sarner, S Barrett, "A Close Look at Therapeutic Touch". Journal of the American Medical Association, April 1, 1998; 279(13):1005–1010.
- "TT and Me", by Emily Rosa, Jr. Skeptic, 1998; 6(2):97–99.
- "A Different Way to Heal?". Science Hotline: Scientists Answer Your Questions, with Emily Rosa, Scientific American Frontiers, PBS, June 4, 2002.
- "How to Make an Alien Autopsy Cake," by Emily Rosa and Linda Rosa, Jr. Skeptic, 1999; 7(3):105.
- "Growing Up Godless: How I Survived Amateur Secular Parenting" by Emily Rosa, in Parenting Beyond Belief: On Raising Ethical, Caring Kids Without Religion, Dale McGowan, ed., AMACOM, 2007. ISBN 0-8144-7426-8. (Other contributors included Richard Dawkins, Julia Sweeney, and Penn Jillette.)
