= Hollyhock Retreat =

Spiritual retreat in British Columbia, Canada

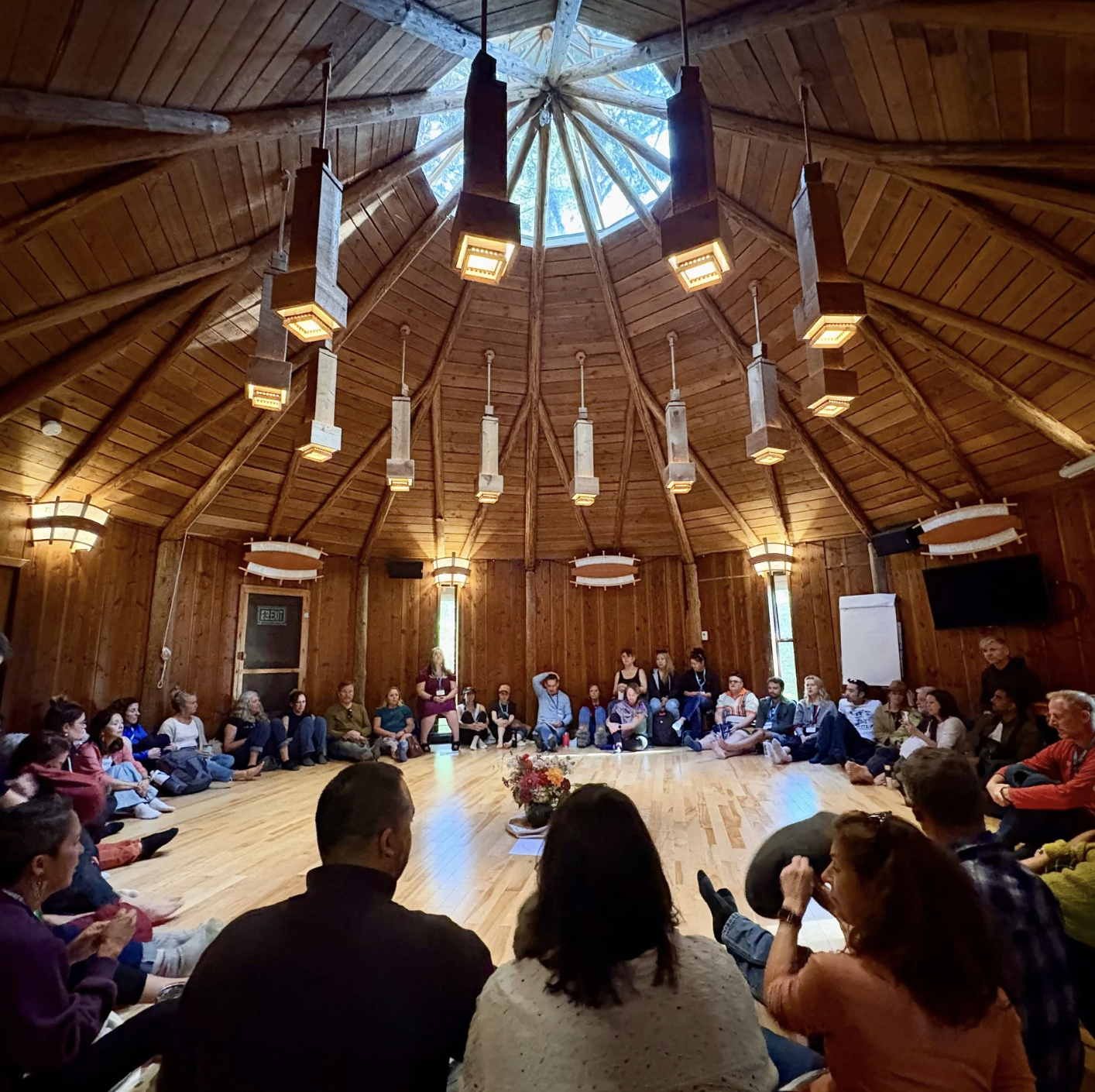

Hollyhock Lifelong Learning Centre is a not-for-profit educational institute in British Columbia, Canada. It offers programs in health and wellness, creativity, general wisdom, and leadership development on its Cortes Island campus. It also offers programs at various locations in Vancouver throughout the year.

== History ==
Hollyhock was founded in 1982 by Rex Weyler, Siobhan Robinsong and Lee Robinsong who met at Greenpeace. While beach walking on Cortes Island, they saw the abandoned hand-crafted buildings of the former Cold Mountain Institute. Siobhan drew Rex's attention to crimson hollyhocks peeking over a hawthorn hedge. Days before, Rex was given that same vision by an intuitive seer at the Vancouver Folk Music Festival. Friends Peggy Taylor, Rick Ingrasci, Torkin Wakefield, Charles Steinberg, Yvonne Kipp and Michael Moore joined to purchase the land. Many others invested over the years, and in 1982, this group of 30 'founders' purchased the abandoned Cold Mountain Institute. Dana Bass Solomon joined in the late 1990s as board member, soon as CEO. With Joel Solomon, Board Chair, (whom she later married), together they have led two decades of mission advancement. In 2008 the partner group donated full ownership and Hollyhock Leadership Institute became a registered charity.

== Programming ==
Over the years, Hollyhock has offered a wide range of personal, spiritual and leadership development programs to an international clientele, serving 1,800 to 2,300 guests per year. The Centre hosts education and training on topics including activism, creative writing, group facilitation, singing, cooking, painting, drawing, entrepreneurship, dance, photography, leadership, social ventures, woodcarving, storytelling, kayaking, animal communication, relationships, mindfulness, nonviolent communication, spiritual chanting, meditation, Tibetan Buddhism, Kabbalah, hara hachi bu, yoga, morphic resonance, holistic approaches for dealing with cancer and integrative medicine.

Prominent instructors at Hollyhock have included Robert Bateman, Gabor Maté, Jane Siberry, Patrick Lane and Nick Bantock. Hollyhock operates a scholarship fund. In 2008, the centre distributed CAN $97,000 to attendees.

== Garden ==
Hollyhock operates a renowned one-acre French-intensive garden on the property. Flowers and food from the garden are used in the retreat centre's meals.

== Political links ==
Hollyhock is led by CEO Dana Bass Solomon, while the board's chairperson is her husband, Joel Solomon, both of whom have connections to the former mayor of Vancouver, Gregor Robertson. Robertson was the treasurer of Hollyhock Centre Ltd. from 2003 to 2004, during which he also served on the board of directors. A number of connections have been drawn between Vancouver City Hall and Hollyhock, in part due to the number of people hired by the City of Vancouver who have connections to the retreat centre. Solomon responded to these claims by stating that Hollyhock provides space for like-minded people to connect around social and environmental topics, and that the resort's programming attracts attendees from across the political spectrum.
