= Curiosity (TV series) =

- Genre: Documentary
- Composer: Sheridan Tongue
- Country of origin: United States
- No. of seasons: 2
- No. of episodes: 29

Production
- Executive producers: Alan Eyres; Ben Bowie; John Smithson; Susan Winslow; Philip J Day
- Editors: Simon Greenwood; Ben Harding
- Camera setup: Multiple
- Running time: 45 minutes
- Production companies: Darlow Smithson Productions; Edge West Productions

Original release
- Network: Discovery Channel
- Release: August 7, 2011 – January 27, 2013

Curiosity is an American documentary television series that premiered on August 7, 2011, on the Discovery Channel. Each episode focuses on one question in science, technology, and society (e.g., why the RMS Titanic sank) and, for the first season, features a different celebrity host. Stephen Hawking hosted the premiere episode titled "Did God Create the Universe?", which aired simultaneously on seven Discovery Communications networks: Discovery Channel, TLC, Discovery Fit and Health, Animal Planet, Science, Investigation Discovery, and Destination America. Season one consists of 16 episodes.

== Curiosity: The Questions of Our Life ==
The development of "Curiosity: The Questions of Our Life", was announced in September 2009. It was to answer questions and mysteries in fields like space, biology, geology, medicine, physics, technology, nature, archaeology, history, and the human mind. It was considered as a groundbreaking series for Discovery like the BBC's Planet Earth and Life. Originally, this series was to be a monthly show airing 12 one-hour episodes each year for 5 years beginning in January 2011. Dan Riskin was initially slated to host.

== Curiosity.com ==
The website was opened in June 2011. It was to be an expert Q&A site, where experts and scholars tried to answer some of life's most profound questions. The 32 topics in site ranges from biodiversity to nanotechnology. So far 12,000 questions have been answered. On November 11, 2014, Curiosity.com became independent of Discovery Communications.

== CuriosityStream.com ==
Ad-free SVOD science and history documentaries.

John Hendricks, founder of the Discovery Channel and creator of the original Curiosity brand, launched CuriosityStream on March 18, 2015. An ad-free subscription video on demand platform for science and history documentaries, CuriosityStream is a continuation of Hendricks' vision for the original Curiosity TV series. The service exclusively features documentaries and series in the areas of Science, Technology, Civilization and the Human Spirit and offers mobile viewing applications on iOS and Android devices.

== Episodes ==
=== Series overview ===
Season	Episodes	Originally released	
Season	Episodes	First released	Last released
1	16	August 7, 2011	November 20, 2011
2	13	October 7, 2012	January 27, 2013

=== Season 1 (2011) ===
No. overall	No. in season	Title	Narrated / presented by	Original release date
1	1	"Did God Create the Universe?"	Stephen Hawking / Benedict Cumberbatch	August 7, 2011
Stephen Hawking says that his 2010 book The Grand Design upset some people. He says that it is valid for him to ask whether one creator god single-handedly created the living and non-living things. He wants to know "what or who created and controls the universe." In the ancient times, even the Vikings believed that "gods made everything." The narrator [Benedict Cumberbatch] states that multiple gods controlled different phenomena for the Vikings. He cites the example that Ægir "caused stormy seas." According to the narrator, Sköll was a "wolf god" who caused solar eclipses. In ancient Greece, Aristarchus of Samos was fascinated by eclipses. Aristarchus wanted to know if solar and lunar eclipses were caused by the Greek gods. A few months before his death in 1277, Pope John XXI declared the laws of nature a heresy. In 1600s, Galileo Galilei found that "some object do not orbit the Earth." Galileo had discovered the four moons of Jupiter. Hawking believed in his childhood that "you never get something for nothing", but now he thinks "you can get a whole universe for free!" Cumberbatch narrates that space is a "vast store of negative energy."
2	2	"Alien Invasion: Are We Ready?"	Michelle Rodriguez	August 14, 2011
There are 100,000,000,000 (100 billion) stars in the Milky Way Galaxy. In addition, Michio Kaku says, "Our telescopes can see perhaps a 100 billion galaxies out there." As a result, there are 10^{22} stars! Kaku says that an electromagnetic pulse (EMP) "short-circuits your electronics.": Interviewed experts: Hakeem M. Oluseyi, Lynn J. Rothschild, Gibor Basri, Michio Kaku, Jacob Haqq-Misra, Jean-Marc Perelmuter, Seth Baum, Seth Shostak, Doug Beason, Christopher Weuve, Charles E. Gannon, David Bartell (sci-fi author), Matt Davis (known around the Dominican University of California as "Disasterman"), Anne Simon.
3	3	"Why is Sex Fun?"	Maggie Gyllenhaal	August 21, 2011
Maggie Gyllenhaal says, "We [women] don't need an orgasm to get pregnant." She visits the Museum of Sex in New York City. Researchers have invented the orgasmatron.: Interviewed experts: Barry Komisaruk, Beverly Whipple, Sarah Ford, Mary Roach, Elisabeth Lloyd, Odile Buisson, Emmanuele A. Jannini at the University of L'Aquila, Ludwig Wildt at the University of Innsbruck, David Puts, Stephanie Ortigue, T. Stuart Meloy.
4	4	"What Sank Titanic?"	Bill Paxton	August 28, 2011
5	5	"Parallel Universes - Are They Real?"	Morgan Freeman	September 4, 2011
6	6	"What's Beneath America?"	Martin Sheen	September 11, 2011
Martin Sheen says that 150 million years ago, the North American Plate and Pacific Plate collided; this collision gave rise to the Sierra Nevada. The California Gold Rush in the 1850s founded the Hearst (George Hearst) and Stanford dynasties. The Powder River Basin (in Wyoming) of the Rocky Mountains contains coal that can power electricity. Dead trees and plants turn into peat; over millions of years, the peat turns into coal. In contrast, the raw material for crude oil is "dead animals." The Bakken oil fields of North Dakota contain thousands of wells. "America the Beautiful" is a song about America's farmland in the Midwest. The Upper Peninsula of Michigan is rich in iron.: Interviewed experts: Todd Bracken (jeweler).
7	7	"How Will the World End?"	Samuel L. Jackson	September 18, 2011
The 2012 phenomenon predicted by Mayan priests turned out to be false! Samuel Jackson says that 5 cataclysmic events can destroy our world: 1. An ARkStorm; 2. An asteroid impact 3. A mega-quake 4. A mega-tsunami 5. A super volcano.; Jackson discusses seismic activity near Reelfoot Lake in Tennessee. He spends considerable time talking about Tiptonville, Tennessee. La Palma in the Atlantic Ocean near Africa is the tip of an undersea volcano.: Interviewed experts: Brian A. Skiff, Roy Van Arsdale.
8	8	"Atlantis Uncovered"	Terry O'Quinn	September 25, 2011
9	9	"I, Caveman"	Morgan Spurlock	October 2, 2011
After hunting failures, the participants of the experiment receive an atlatl and a dart.
10	10	"Egypt: What Lies Beneath?"	Brendan Fraser	October 9, 2011
11	11	"Can You Live Forever?"	Adam Savage	October 16, 2011
In an imaginary story, the life of Adam Savage is saved by 3D bioprinting.
12	12	"World's Dirtiest Man"	Mike Rowe	October 23, 2011
13	13	"How Evil are You?"	Eli Roth	October 30, 2011
Interviewed experts: James H. Fallon, Jerry M. Burger.
14	14	"Life Before Birth"	Courteney Cox	November 6, 2011
15	15	"What's America Worth?"	Donald Trump	November 13, 2011
Donald Trump says,"We have the highest number of millionaires in the world." Trump goes on to state that the total value of our "black gold" reserves is $768,000,000,000 (equivalent to $1.099172×10^{12} in 2025). Next, he says that the gold mines in Elko, Nevada hide $75,000,000,000 (equivalent to $1.07341×10^{11} in 2025) in gold. Trump says, "Americans own more cars per capita than any other nation on Earth." He says that the American power grid is worth $1,700,000,000,000 (equivalent to $2.433×10^{12} in 2025). Trump concludes that the total value of America is $31,000,000,000,000 (equivalent to $4.4368×10^{13} in 2025).: Interviewed experts: Craig C. Barto (co-founder of Signal Hill Petroleum, Inc.).
16	16	"Your Body on Drugs"	Robin Williams	November 20, 2011
Robin Williams and medical crew observe drug addicts. Under psychological pressure, marijuana induces "a lack of urgency" along with impaired memory; methamphetamine causes confusion and crash; cocaine causes violence and delusion; heroin induces panic.; Robin Williams states that although cocaine increases the physical strength of the subject in the experiment, it is physiologically dangerous because the heart rate increases substantially.

=== Season 2 (2012) ===
No. overall	No. in season	Title	Narrated by	Original release date
17	1	"Plane Crash"	Josh Charles	October 7, 2012
After years of planning, a Boeing 727 airplane is intentionally crashed in the Mexican desert in April 2012. The precedent for this 2012 crash was the NASA airplane test crash in 1984. The producers of this episode purchase the Boeing 727 for the "bargain price of $450,000." (equivalent to $631,000 in 2025). The pilot must jump out of the plane moments before it crashes.
18	2	"The Devil's Triangle"	Josh Charles	October 14, 2012
The Bermuda Triangle has a history of underwater landslides which trigger a violent release of methane. Bubbles reduce the density of water with deadly consequences for floating boats. The experiments done for this television episode fail to sink a boat with massive release of air bubbles underwater! Rogue waves can also sink boats. Rogue waves can form during hurricanes. Extreme forms of lightning can destroy an airplane.
19	3	"I Was Mummified"	Josh Charles	October 21, 2012
The body farm in Knoxville, Tennessee is where bodies are donated for research. A lung cancer patient named Alan Billis in Britain gives consent to be mummified for this television episode. Later, in 2011, he dies. The ancient Egyptians used a type of salt called natron to mummify humans. The experts go to the KV35 tomb in the Valley of the Kings in Egypt. There, they are given access to the mummy of Queen Tiye. The commentators believe that mummification reached its peak in the 18th Dynasty of Egypt.: Interviewed experts: William M. Bass, Steven Wilhelm at the University of Tennessee, Stephen Buckley.
20	4	"Brainwashed"	Josh Charles	October 28, 2012
In 1972, Patty Hearst is kidnapped and brainwashed to commit crimes with her abductors. For this television episode, the producers use an airsoft gun.: Interviewed experts: Tom Silver (hypnosis expert).
21	5	"Battlefield Cell"	Josh Charles	November 4, 2012
22	6	"Sex in America"	Josh Charles	November 11, 2012
Alfred Kinsey and his research team interviewed thousands of Americans in the late 1940s to inquire about their sexual behavior. The Sinclair Institute has been "teaching couples how to make love for decades."
23	7	"Megastorm"	Josh Charles	November 18, 2012
Superstorm Sandy slammed into the Eastern U.S. seaboard a month before the airing of this episode in 2012.
24	8	"Mankind Rising"	Josh Charles	November 25, 2012
The first water worm came into being on Earth about 550 million years ago. Myllokunmingia were fish-like creatures under threat from Anomalocaris. Ichthyostega can breathe air or water. The land-dwelling Casineria produce eggs with soft shells. Varanops eat meat. Varanops preyed on the Protorosaurus. Ecteninion emerged about 220 million years ago. Batodon came into being 66 million years ago. About 65 million years ago, an asteroid strikes the American state of Montana. Purgatorius is the "bug-eating ancestor" of humans. Altiatlasius is the ancestor of primates.
25	9	"Volcano Time Bomb"	Josh Charles	December 9, 2012
The Ambrym lava lake is a very dangerous volcano in the country of Vanuatu in the South Pacific Ocean. The Pacific Ring of Fire is known for its volcanic eruptions; it includes the Newberry Volcano in Oregon. At Newberry, volcanic rocks such as obsidian and rhyolite are found. The 2010 eruptions of Ey-jaf-jall-a-jökull is discussed in this television episode. The Cascade Range contain numerous active volcanoes. The Yellowstone Super-volcano is in Wyoming. The Long Valley Caldera is next to Mammoth Mountain in eastern California.: Interviewed experts: Geoff Mackley, Kenneth Sims (geologist), Freysteinn Sigmundsson, Rikke Pedersen.
26	10	"What destroyed the Hindenburg?"	Josh Charles	December 16, 2012
The Hindenburg disaster in 1937 "remains unsolved." The Hindenburg was a symbol of Nazi German technology.
27	11	"X-Ray Yellowstone"	Josh Charles	December 23, 2012
28	12	"Sun Storm"	Josh Charles	December 30, 2012
The Sun's powerful energy generates magnetism which governs Sunspots. Sunspots are the "breeding ground of solar storms." The Carrington Event in 1859 caused major damages.: Interviewed experts: Phil Plait, William (Bill) Murtagh.
29	13	"Monster Squid: The Giant is Real"	Josh Charles	January 27, 2013
