= Orgone =

Pseudoscientific concept by Wilhelm Reich

Orgone "energy accumulator"

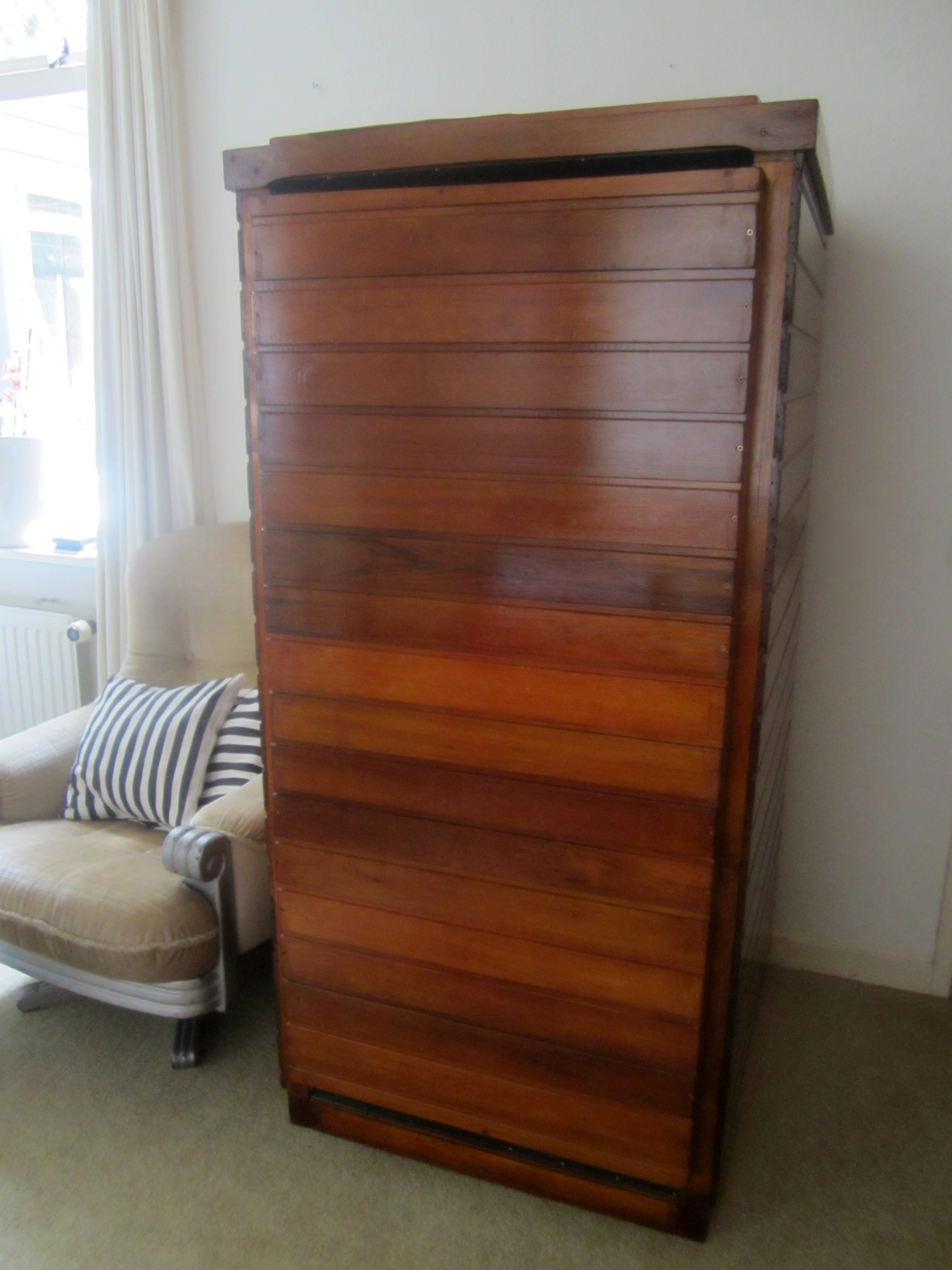
(with the door closed)

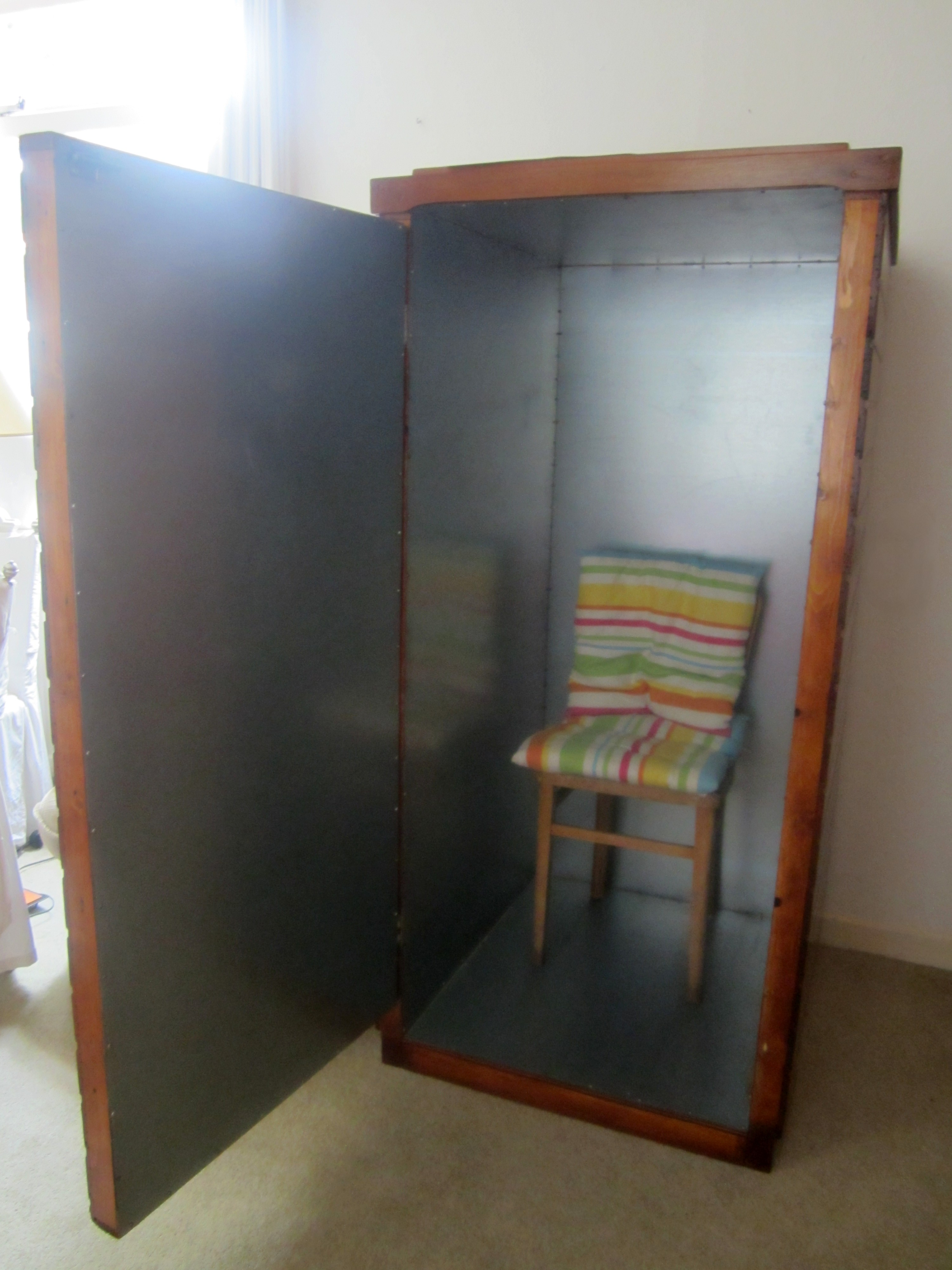
(with the door open)

Alternating layers of organic and non-organic materials inside the walls supposedly increase the orgone concentration inside the enclosure relative to the surrounding environment.

Orgone (/ˈɔːrɡoʊn/ OR-gohn) is a pseudoscientific concept variously described as an esoteric energy or hypothetical universal life force. Originally proposed in the 1930s by Wilhelm Reich, and developed by Reich's student Charles Kelley after Reich's death in 1957, orgone was conceived as the anti-entropic principle of the universe, a creative substratum in all of nature comparable to Mesmer's animal magnetism (1779), to the Odic force (1845) of Carl Reichenbach and to Henri Bergson's élan vital (1907). Orgone was seen as a massless, omnipresent substance, similar to luminiferous aether, but more closely associated with living energy than with inert matter. It could allegedly coalesce to create organization on all scales, from the smallest microscopic units—called "bions" in orgone theory—to macroscopic structures like organisms, clouds, or even galaxies.

Reich argued that deficits or constrictions in bodily orgone were at the root of many diseases, most prominently cancer, much as deficits or constrictions in the libido could produce neuroses in Freudian theory. Reich founded the Orgone Institute c. 1942 to pursue research into orgone energy after he immigrated to the US in 1939; he used it to publish literature and distribute material relating to the topic for over a decade. Reich designed special "orgone energy accumulators"—devices ostensibly collecting orgone energy from the environment—to enable the study of orgone energy and to be applied medically to improve general health and vitality. Ultimately, the U.S. Food and Drug Administration (FDA) obtained a federal injunction barring the interstate distribution of orgone-related materials because Reich and his associates were making false and misleading claims. But an associate of Reich violated the injunction, and a judge later sentenced Reich to jail and ordered the banning and destruction of all orgone-related materials at the institute.

Reich denied the assertion that orgone accumulators could improve sexual health by providing orgastic potency.

The National Center for Complementary and Integrative Health lists orgone as a type of "putative energy", writing that "putative energy fields (also called biofields) have defied measurement to date by reproducible methods. Therapies involving putative energy fields are based on the concept that human beings are infused with a subtle form of energy. This proposed vital energy or life force is known under different names in different cultures, such as qi ... prana, etheric energy, fohat, orgone, odic force, mana, and homeopathic resonance".

After Reich's death, research into the concept of orgone passed to some of his students, such as Kelley, and later to a new generation of researchers. An Institute for Orgonomic Science was founded in New York in 1982, dedicated to the continuation of Reich's work; it publishes a digital journal and collects corresponding works. However, there was no empirical support for the concept of orgone in medicine or the physical sciences, and research into the concept concluded with the end of the institute.

== History ==
The concept of orgone belongs to Reich's later work after he emigrated to the US. Reich's early work was based on the Freudian concept of the libido, though influenced by sociological understandings with which Freud disagreed but which were to some degree followed by other prominent theorists such as Herbert Marcuse and Carl Jung. While Freud had focused on a solipsistic conception of mind in which unconscious and inherently selfish primal drives (primarily the sexual drive, or libido) were suppressed or sublimated by internal representations (cathexes) of parental figures (the superego), for Reich libido was a life-affirming force repressed by society directly. For example, in one of his better-known analyses, Reich observes a workers' political rally, noting that participants were careful not to violate signs that prohibited walking on the grass; Reich saw this as the state co-opting unconscious responses to parental authority as a means of controlling behavior. He was expelled from the Institute of Psycho-analysis because of these disagreements over the nature of the libido and his increasingly political stance. He was forced to leave Germany soon after Hitler came to power.

Reich with one of his cloudbusters, a device which supposedly could influence weather by altering levels of atmospheric orgone

Reich took an increasingly bioenergetic view of libido, perhaps influenced by his tutor Paul Kammerer and another biologist, Otto Heinrich Warburg. In the early 20th century, when molecular biology was in its infancy, developmental biology in particular still presented mysteries that made the idea of a specific life energy respectable, as was articulated by theorists such as Hans Driesch. As a psycho-analyst, Reich aligned such theories with the Freudian libido, while as a materialist, he believed such a life force must be susceptible to physical experiments.

Reich wrote in his best-known book, The Function of the Orgasm: "Between 1919 and 1921, I became familiar with Driesch's 'Philosophie des Organischen' and his 'Ordnungslehre'... Driesch's contention seemed incontestable to me. He argued that, in the sphere of the life function, the whole could be developed from a part, whereas a machine could not be made from a screw... However, I couldn't quite accept the transcendentalism of the life principle. Seventeen years later I was able to resolve the contradiction on the basis of a formula pertaining to the function of energy. Driesch's theory was always present in my mind when I thought about vitalism. The vague feeling I had about the irrational nature of his assumption turned out to be justified in the end. He landed among the spiritualists."

The concept of orgone resulted from this work in the psycho-physiology of libido. After Reich migrated to the US, he began to speculate about biological development and evolution and then branched into much broader speculations about the nature of the universe. This led him to the conception of "bions," self-luminescent sub-cellular vesicles that he believed were observable in decaying materials and presumably present universally. Initially, he thought of bions as electrodynamic or radioactive entities, as had the Russian biologist Alexander Gurwitsch, but later concluded that he had discovered an entirely unknown but measurable force, which he then named "orgone": a neologism probably formed from the Greek root org- "impulse, excitement" (as in org-asm), plus the Greek neutral suffix -one (as in ozone).

For Reich, neurosis became a physical manifestation he called "body armor"—deeply seated tensions and inhibitions in the physical body that were not separated from any mental effects that might be observed. He developed a therapeutic approach he called vegetotherapy that was aimed at opening and releasing this body armor so that free instinctive reflexes—which he considered a token of psychic well-being—could take over.

== Evaluation ==
Orgone was closely associated with sexuality: Reich, following Freud, saw nascent sexuality as the primary energetic force of life. The term itself was chosen to share a root with the word orgasm, which both Reich and Freud took as a fundamental expression of psychological health. This focus on sexuality, while acceptable in the clinical perspective of Viennese psychoanalytic circles, scandalized the conservative American public even as it appealed to countercultural figures like William S. Burroughs and Jack Kerouac.

In some cases, Reich's experimental techniques do not appear to have been very careful or include precautions to remove experimental bias. Reich was concerned with experimental verification from other scientists. Albert Einstein agreed to participate, but thought Reich's research lacked scientific detachment and experimental rigor, and concluded that the effect was simply due to the temperature gradient inside the room. "Through these experiments I regard the matter as completely solved," he wrote to Reich on 7 February 1941. Upon further correspondence from Reich, Einstein replied that he could not devote any additional time to the matter and asked that his name not be misused for advertising purposes.

Orgone and its related concepts were quickly denounced in the post-World War II American press. Reich and his students were seen as a "cult of sex and anarchy", at least in part because orgone was linked with the title of his book The Function of the Orgasm, and this led to numerous investigations as a communist and denunciation under a wide variety of other pretexts. The psychoanalytical community of the time saw his approach to healing diseases as quackery of the worst sort. In 1954, the US Food and Drug Administration obtained an injunction to prevent Reich from making medical claims relating to orgone, which prevented him from shipping "orgone devices" across state lines, among other stipulations. Reich resisted the order to cease interstate distribution of orgone and was jailed, and the FDA destroyed Reich's books, research materials, and devices at his institute relating to orgone.

Some psychotherapists and psychologists practicing various kinds of body psychotherapy and somatic psychology have continued to use Reich's proposed emotional-release methods and character-analysis ideas.

== In popular culture ==
Jack Kerouac, "On The Road" 1955, Old Bull in New Orleans offers Sal and Dean use of his orgone accumulator he made. Page 126

Dušan Makavejev opened his 1971 satirical film W.R.: Mysteries of the Organism with documentary coverage of Reich and his development of orgone accumulators, combining this with other imagery and a fictional sub-plot in a collage mocking sexual and political authorities. Scenes include one of only "ten or fifteen orgone boxes left in the country" at that time.

The 2025 first-person shooter video game Psycho Patrol R references Reich's ideas. In the game's setting, orgone has been scientifically verified and is used as a power source for advanced technologies.

== See also ==
- Alexander Gurwitsch
- Animal magnetism of Franz Anton Mesmer
- Energy (spiritual)
- Energy medicine
- Fringe science
- Integratron
- List of ineffective cancer treatments
- Odic force of Carl Reichenbach
- Rupert Sheldrake
- Scientific skepticism
- Thetan
- Vitalism
- Vril
