= Reichian therapy =

Reichian therapy can refer to several schools of thought and therapeutic techniques whose common touchstone is their origins in the work of psychoanalyst Wilhelm Reich (1897–1957). Some examples are:

- Character Analysis, the analysis of character structures that act in the form of resistances of the ego.
- Bioenergetic analysis, which combines psychological analysis, active work with the body and relational therapeutic work.
- Body psychotherapy, which addresses the body and the mind as a whole with emphasis on the reciprocal relationships within body and mind.
- Neo-Reichian massage, whose practitioners attempt to locate and dissolve body armoring (also called "holding patterns").
- Vegetotherapy, a form of psychotherapy that involves the physical manifestations of emotions.
