= Orgasm =

Intense physical sensation of sexual release

Orgasm (from Greek ὀργασμός, orgasmos; "excitement, swelling"), sexual climax, or simply climax, is the sudden release of accumulated sexual excitement during the sexual response cycle, characterized by intense sexual pleasure resulting in rhythmic, involuntary muscular contractions in the pelvic region. Orgasms are controlled by the involuntary or autonomic nervous system and are experienced by both males and females; the body's response includes muscular spasms (in multiple areas), a general euphoric sensation, and, frequently, body movements and vocalizations. The period after orgasm (known as the resolution phase) is typically a relaxing experience due to the release of the neurohormones oxytocin and prolactin, as well as endorphins (or "endogenous morphine").

Human orgasms usually result from physical sexual stimulation of the penis in males (typically accompanied by ejaculation) and of the clitoris (and vagina) in females. Sexual stimulation can be by masturbation or with a sexual partner (penetrative sex, non-penetrative sex, or other sexual activity). Physical stimulation is not a requisite, as it is possible to reach orgasm through psychological means. Reaching orgasm may be difficult without a suitable psychological state. During sleep, a sex dream can trigger an orgasm and the release of sexual fluids (nocturnal emission).

The health effects surrounding the human orgasm are diverse. There are many physiological responses during sexual activity, including a relaxed state, as well as changes in the central nervous system, such as a temporary decrease in the metabolic activity of large parts of the cerebral cortex, while there is no change or increased metabolic activity in the limbic (i.e., "bordering") areas of the brain. There are sexual dysfunctions involving orgasm, such as anorgasmia. The importance of reaching orgasm for sex to be satisfying varies between individuals, and theories about the biological and evolutionary functions of orgasm differ.

== Definitions ==
In a clinical context, orgasm is usually defined strictly by the muscular contractions involved during sexual activity, along with the characteristic patterns of change in heart rate, blood pressure, and often respiration rate and depth. This is categorized as the sudden discharge of accumulated sexual tension during the sexual response cycle, resulting in rhythmic muscular contractions in the pelvic region. Definitions of orgasm vary, and at least 26 definitions of orgasm are listed in the 2001 journal Clinical Psychology Review.

There is some debate about whether certain types of sexual sensations should be accurately classified as orgasms, including female orgasms caused by G-spot stimulation alone, and the demonstration of extended or continuous orgasms lasting several minutes or even an hour. The question centers around the clinical definition of orgasm, but this way of viewing orgasm is merely physiological, while there are also psychological, endocrinological, and neurological definitions of orgasm. In these and similar cases, the sensations experienced are subjective and do not necessarily involve the involuntary contractions characteristic of orgasm. In both sexes, they are extremely pleasurable and often felt throughout the body, causing a mental state that is often described as transcendental, and with vasocongestion and associated pleasure comparable to that of a full-contractionary orgasm. For example, modern findings support the distinction between ejaculation and male orgasm. For this reason, there are views on both sides as to whether these can be accurately defined as orgasms.

== Achievement ==
Organs and tissues involved in triggering the female orgasm

Orgasms can be achieved during a variety of activities, including vaginal, anal, oral, manual, and non-penetrative sex, or masturbation. They may also be achieved by the use of a sex toy or an erotic electrostimulation. Achieving orgasm by stimulation of the nipples or other erogenous zones is rarer. Multiple orgasms, i.e. orgasms that occur within a short period of one another, are also possible, especially in women, but uncommon.

In addition to physical stimulation, orgasm can be achieved from psychological arousal alone, such as during dreaming (nocturnal emission), or by forced orgasm. Orgasm by psychological stimulation alone was first reported among people who had spinal cord injuries. Although sexual function and sexuality after spinal cord injury are very often impacted, this injury does not deprive one of sexual feelings such as sexual arousal and erotic desires.

Scientific literature focuses on the psychology of female orgasm significantly more than it does on the psychology of male orgasm, which "appears to reflect the assumption that female orgasm is psychologically more complex than male orgasm", but "the limited empirical evidence available suggests that male and female orgasm may bear more similarities than differences. In one controlled study by Vance and Wagner (1976), independent raters could not differentiate written descriptions of male versus female orgasm experiences".

=== Female ===
==== Factors and variability ====
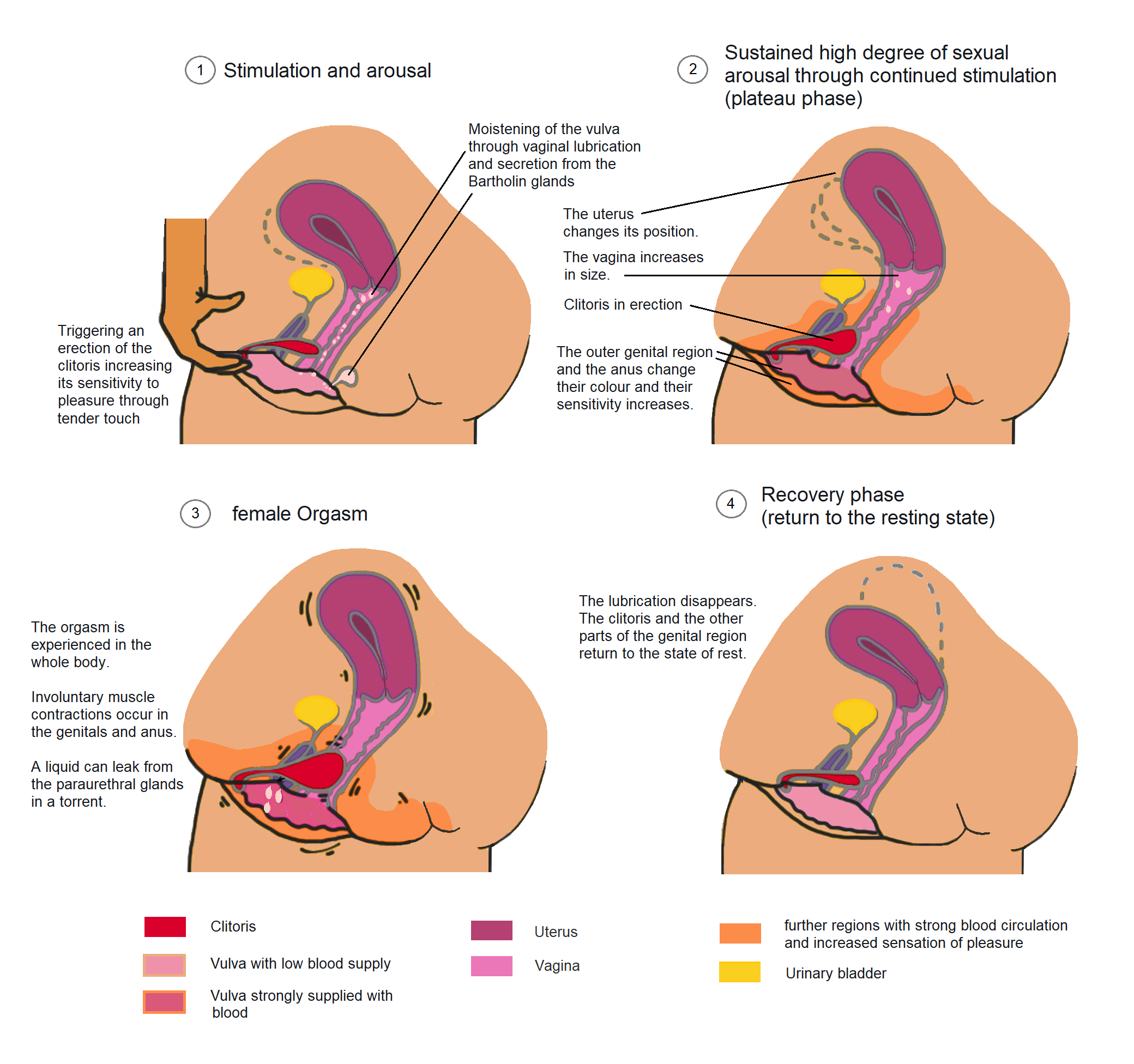
Schematic representation of the phases of female sexual arousal and female orgasm

In women, the most common way to achieve orgasm is by direct sexual stimulation of the clitoris (meaning consistent digital, oral, or other concentrated friction against the external parts of the clitoris). General statistics indicate that 70–80 percent of women require direct clitoral stimulation to achieve orgasm, although indirect clitoral stimulation (for example, via vaginal penetration) may also be sufficient. The Mayo Clinic states, "Orgasms vary in intensity, and women vary in the frequency of their orgasms and the amount of stimulation necessary to trigger an orgasm." Clitoral orgasms are easier to achieve because the glans of the clitoris, or clitoris as a whole, has more than 8,000 sensory nerve endings, which is as many (or more in some cases) nerve endings as are present in the human penis or glans penis. As the clitoris is homologous to the penis, it is equivalent in its capacity to receive sexual stimulation.

One misconception, particularly in older research publications, is that the vagina is completely insensitive. In reality, there are areas in the anterior vaginal wall and between the top junction of the labia minora and the urethra that are especially sensitive. With regard to specific density of nerve endings, while the area commonly described as the G-spot may produce an orgasm, and the urethral sponge (the area in which the G-spot may be found) runs along the "roof" of the vagina and can create pleasurable sensations when stimulated, intense sexual pleasure (including orgasm) from vaginal stimulation is occasional or otherwise absent because the vagina has significantly fewer nerve endings than the clitoris. The greatest concentration of vaginal nerve endings are at the lower third (near the entrance) of the vagina.

Sex educator Rebecca Chalker states that only one part of the clitoris, the urethral sponge, is in contact with the penis, fingers, or a dildo in the vagina. Hite and Chalker state that the tip of the clitoris and the inner lips, which are also very sensitive, are not receiving direct stimulation during penetrative intercourse. Because of this, some couples may engage in the woman on top position or the coital alignment technique to maximize clitoral stimulation. For some women, the clitoris is very sensitive after climax, making additional stimulation initially painful.

Masters and Johnson argue that all women are potentially multiply orgasmic, but that multiply orgasmic men are rare, and stated that "the female is capable of rapid return to orgasm immediately following an orgasmic experience, if re-stimulated before tensions have dropped below plateau phase response levels". Though it is generally reported that women do not experience a refractory period and thus can experience an additional orgasm, or multiple orgasms, soon after the first one, some sources state that both men and women experience a refractory period because women may also experience a period after orgasm in which further sexual stimulation does not produce excitement. After the initial orgasm, subsequent orgasms for women may be stronger or more pleasurable as the stimulation accumulates.

==== Clitoral and vaginal categories ====
Images of the female vulva in various stages of the sexual response cycle

Discussions of female orgasm are complicated by orgasms in women typically being divided into two categories: clitoral orgasm and vaginal (or G-spot) orgasm. In 1973, Irving Singer theorized that there are three types of female orgasms; he categorized these as vulval, uterine, and blended, but because he was a philosopher, "these categories were generated from descriptions of orgasm in literature rather than laboratory studies." In 1982, Ladas, Whipple and Perry also proposed three categories: the tenting type (derived from clitoral stimulation), the A-frame type (derived from G-spot stimulation), and the blended type (derived from clitoral and G-spot stimulation). In 1999, Whipple and Komisaruk proposed cervix stimulation as being able to cause a fourth type of female orgasm.

Female orgasms by means other than clitoral or vaginal/G-spot stimulation are less prevalent in scientific literature, and most scientists contend that no distinction should be made between "types" of female orgasm. This distinction began with Sigmund Freud, who postulated the concept of "vaginal orgasm" as separate from clitoral orgasm. In 1905, Freud stated that clitoral orgasms are purely an adolescent phenomenon and that upon reaching puberty, the proper response of mature women is a change-over to vaginal orgasms, meaning orgasms without any clitoral stimulation. While Freud provided no evidence for this basic assumption, the consequences of this theory were considerable. Many women felt inadequate when they could not achieve orgasm via vaginal intercourse alone, involving little or no clitoral stimulation, as Freud's theory made penile–vaginal intercourse the central component to women's sexual satisfaction.

The first major national surveys of sexual behavior in the U.S. were the Kinsey Reports. Alfred Kinsey was the first researcher to harshly criticize Freud's ideas about female sexuality and orgasm when, through his interviews with thousands of women, Kinsey found that most of the women he surveyed could not have vaginal orgasms. He "criticized Freud and other theorists for projecting male constructs of sexuality onto women" and "viewed the clitoris as the main center of sexual response" and the vagina as "relatively unimportant" for sexual satisfaction, relaying that "few women inserted fingers or objects into their vaginas when they masturbated." He "concluded that satisfaction from penile penetration [is] mainly psychological or perhaps the result of referred sensation".

Masters and Johnson's research into the female sexual response cycle, as well as Shere Hite's, generally supported Kinsey's findings about female orgasm. Masters and Johnson's research on the topic came at the time of the second-wave feminist movement and inspired feminists such as Anne Koedt, author of The Myth of the Vaginal Orgasm, to speak about the "false distinction" made between clitoral and vaginal orgasms and women's biology not being properly analyzed.

==== Clitoral and vaginal relationships ====
Accounts that the vagina is capable of producing orgasms continue to be subject to debate because, in addition to the vagina's low concentration of nerve endings, reports of the G-spot's location are inconsistent—it appears to be nonexistent in some women and may be an extension of another structure, such as the Skene's gland or the clitoris, which is a part of the Skene's gland. In a January 2012 The Journal of Sexual Medicine review examining years of research into the existence of the G-spot, scholars state that "[r]eports in the public media would lead one to believe the G-spot is a well-characterized entity capable of providing extreme sexual stimulation, yet this is far from the truth".

Possible explanations for the G-spot were examined by Masters and Johnson, who were the first researchers to determine that the clitoral structures surround and extend along and within the labia. In addition to observing that the majority of their female subjects could only have clitoral orgasms, they found that both clitoral and vaginal orgasms had the same stages of physical response. On this basis, they argue that clitoral stimulation is the source of both kinds of orgasms, reasoning that the clitoris is stimulated during penetration by friction against its hood; their notion that this provides the clitoris with sufficient sexual stimulation has been criticized by researchers such as Elisabeth Lloyd.

Australian urologist Helen O'Connell's 2005 research additionally indicates a connection between orgasms experienced vaginally and the clitoris, suggesting that clitoral tissue extends into the anterior wall of the vagina and that therefore clitoral and vaginal orgasms are of the same origin. Some studies, using medical ultrasound, have found physiological evidence of the G-spot in women who report having orgasms during vaginal intercourse, but O'Connell suggests that the clitoris's interconnected relationship with the vagina is the physiological explanation for the conjectured G-spot. Having used MRI technology which enabled her to note a direct relationship between the legs or roots of the clitoris and the erectile tissue of the "clitoral bulbs" and corpora, and the distal urethra and vagina, she stated that the vaginal wall is the clitoris; lifting the skin off the vagina on the side walls reveals the bulbs of the clitoris—triangular, crescental masses of erectile tissue. O'Connell et al., who performed dissections on the female genitals of cadavers and used photography to map the structure of nerves in the clitoris, were already aware that the clitoris is more than just its glans and asserted in 1998 that there is more erectile tissue associated with the clitoris than is generally described in anatomical textbooks. They concluded that some females have more extensive clitoral tissue and nerves than others, especially having observed this in young cadavers as compared to elderly ones, and therefore whereas the majority of females can only achieve orgasm by direct stimulation of the external parts of the clitoris, the stimulation of the more generalized tissues of the clitoris via intercourse may be sufficient for others.

French researchers Odile Buisson and Pierre Foldès report similar findings to those of O'Connell's. In 2008, they published the first complete 3D sonogram via medical ultrasound of the stimulated clitoris, and republished it in 2009 with new research, demonstrating the ways in which erectile tissue of the clitoris engorges and surrounds the vagina, arguing that women may be able to achieve vaginal orgasm via stimulation of the G-spot because the highly innervated clitoris is pulled closely to the anterior wall of the vagina when the woman is sexually aroused and during vaginal penetration. They assert that since the front wall of the vagina is inextricably linked with the internal parts of the clitoris, stimulating the vagina without activating the clitoris may be next to impossible. In their 2009 published study, the "coronal planes during perineal contraction and finger penetration demonstrated a close relationship between the root of the clitoris and the anterior vaginal wall". Buisson and Foldès suggest "the special sensitivity of the lower anterior vaginal wall could be explained by pressure and movement of clitoris's root during a vaginal penetration and subsequent perineal contraction".

Supporting a distinct G-spot is a study by Rutgers University, published 2011, which was the first to map the female genitals onto the sensory portion of the brain; brain scans showed that the brain registered distinct feelings between stimulating the clitoris, the cervix and the vaginal wall – where the G-spot is reported to be – when several women stimulated themselves in a functional magnetic resonance (fMRI) machine. "I think that the bulk of the evidence shows that the G-spot is not a particular thing," stated Barry Komisaruk, head of the research findings. "It's not like saying, 'What is the thyroid gland?' The G-spot is more of a thing like New York City is a thing. It's a region, it's a convergence of many different structures." Commenting on Komisaruk's research and other findings, Emmanuele A. Jannini, a professor of endocrinology at the University of Aquila in Italy, acknowledges a series of essays published in March 2012 in The Journal of Sexual Medicine, which document evidence that vaginal and clitoral orgasms are separate phenomena that activate different areas of the brain and possibly suggest key psychological differences between women.

==== Other factors and research ====
Regular difficulty reaching orgasm after ample sexual stimulation, known as anorgasmia, is significantly more common in women than in men (see below). In addition to sexual dysfunction being a cause for women's inability to reach orgasm, or the amount of time for sexual arousal needed to reach orgasm being variable and longer in women than in men, other factors include a lack of communication between sexual partners about what is needed for the woman to reach orgasm, feelings of sexual inadequacy in either partner, a focus on only penetration (vaginal or otherwise), and men generalizing the trigger for female orgasm based on their own sexual experiences with other women.

Scholars state "many couples are locked into the idea that orgasms should be achieved only through intercourse [vaginal sex]" and that "[e]ven the word foreplay suggests that any other form of sexual stimulation is merely preparation for the 'main event.'...Because women reach orgasm through intercourse less consistently than men, they are more likely than men to have faked an orgasm". Sex counselor Ian Kerner states, "It's a myth that using the penis is the main way to pleasure a woman." He cites research concluding that women reach orgasm about 25 percent of the time with intercourse, compared with 81 percent of the time during oral sex (cunnilingus).

In the first large-scale empirical study worldwide to link specific practices with orgasm, reported in the Journal of Sex Research in 2006, demographic and sexual history variables were comparatively weakly associated with orgasm. Data was analyzed from the Australian Study of Health and Relationships, a national telephone survey of sexual behavior and attitudes and sexual health knowledge carried out in 2001–02, with a representative sample of 19,307 Australians aged 16 to 59. Practices included "vaginal intercourse alone (12%), vaginal + manual stimulation of the man's and/or woman's genitals (49%), and vaginal intercourse + manual + oral (32%)" and the "[e]ncounters may also have included other practices. Men had an orgasm in 95 percent of encounters and women in 69 percent. Generally, the more practices engaged in, the higher a woman's chance of having an orgasm. Women were more likely to reach orgasm in encounters including cunnilingus". Other studies suggest that women exposed to lower levels of prenatal androgens are more likely to experience orgasm during vaginal intercourse than other women. Foreplay has been found to be positively associated with female orgasm.

==== Exercise-induced ====
Kinsey, in his 1953 book Sexual Behavior in the Human Female, states that exercise could bring about sexual pleasure, including orgasm. A review in 1990 on the sexual response as exercise states that the field was poorly researched and that aerobic or isotonic exercise that resembles sexual activity or sexual positions can induce sexual pleasure, including orgasm. A 2007 review of the relationship between pelvic floor dysfunction and sexual problems in men and women finds that they are commonly linked and suggests that physical therapy strengthening the pelvic floor could help address the sexual problems but that it was not well studied enough to recommend. Starting in at least 2007, the term "coregasm" was used in popular media to refer to exercise-induced orgasm, or in academic parlance "exercise-induced sexual pleasure", and an extensive discussion of the "yogasm" occurred in a 2011 Daily Beast posting. A paper published in 2012 presents results of an online survey of women who had experienced an orgasm or other sexual pleasure during exercise. The paper was widely discussed in popular media when it was published. The authors of the paper said that research on the relationship between exercise and sexual response was still lacking. Using data from the nationally representative 2014 National Survey of Sexual Health and Behavior, a 2021 study estimated that about 9% of U.S. adults had experienced an orgasm during exercise at least once.

==== Emotional and cognitive factors in female orgasm ====
Various studies have linked emotional and cognitive aspects to female orgasm and sexual satisfaction. Negative thoughts about failure have been associated with difficulty achieving orgasm, whereas positive emotions during sexual activity are significantly and positively associated with orgasm. A study examining the relationship between body awareness and female orgasm found a positive association between awareness of bodily sensations and emotions and both the frequency of orgasms and satisfaction with them. Specifically, the facet of Noticing predicted orgasm frequency, Body Trusting predicted orgasm satisfaction, and Attention Regulation predicted both. Cognitive-behavioral factors that impair the ability to achieve orgasm include "spectatoring" (observing oneself from an external perspective), cognitive distraction, maladaptive sexual beliefs, performance anxiety, deficits in attention and interoceptive awareness, and behavioral avoidance. Feelings of stress, as well as poor emotional connection with a partner, are negatively associated with female orgasm.

=== Male ===
==== Variability ====
In men, the most common way of achieving orgasm is by physical sexual stimulation of the penis. This is usually accompanied by ejaculation, but it is possible, though rare, for men to orgasm without ejaculation (known as a "dry orgasm"). Prepubescent boys have dry orgasms. Dry orgasms can also occur as a result of retrograde ejaculation, or hypogonadism. Men may also ejaculate without reaching orgasm, which is known as anorgasmic ejaculation. They may also achieve orgasm by stimulation of the prostate (see below).

==== Two-stage model ====
The traditional view of male orgasm is that there are two stages: emission accompanying orgasm, almost instantly followed by a refractory period. The refractory period is the recovery phase after orgasm during which it is physiologically impossible for a man to have additional orgasms. In 1966, Masters and Johnson published pivotal research about the phases of sexual stimulation. Their work included women and men and—unlike Kinsey in 1948 and 1953—tried to determine the physiological stages before and after orgasm.

Masters and Johnson state that in the first stage, "accessory organs contract and the male can feel the ejaculation coming; two to three seconds later the ejaculation occurs, which the man cannot constrain, delay, or in any way control" and in the second stage, "the male feels pleasurable contractions during ejaculation, reporting greater pleasure tied to a greater volume of ejaculate". They report "for the man the resolution phase includes a superimposed refractory period" and "many males below the age of 30, but relatively few thereafter, have the ability to ejaculate frequently and are subject to only very short refractory periods during the resolution phase". Masters and Johnson equate male orgasm and ejaculation and maintain the necessity for a refractory period between orgasms.

==== Multiplicity ====
There has been little scientific study of multiple orgasms in men. Dunn and Trost define multiple male orgasms as "two or more orgasms with or without ejaculation and without, or with only very limited, de-tumescence (loss of erection) during one and the same sexual encounter". Although it is rare for men to achieve multiple orgasms, some men have reported having multiple consecutive orgasms, particularly without ejaculation. There may not be an obvious refractory period, and the final orgasm may cause a refractory period. Multiple orgasms are more commonly reported in very young men than in older men. In younger men, the refractory period may only last a few minutes, but in older men it may last more than an hour.

An increased production of oxytocin during ejaculation is believed to be chiefly responsible for the refractory period, and the amount by which oxytocin is increased may affect the length of each refractory period. A scientific study to successfully document natural, fully ejaculatory, multiple orgasms in an adult man was conducted at Rutgers University in 1995. During the study, six fully ejaculatory orgasms were experienced in 36 minutes, with no apparent refractory period.

=== Anal and prostate stimulation ===
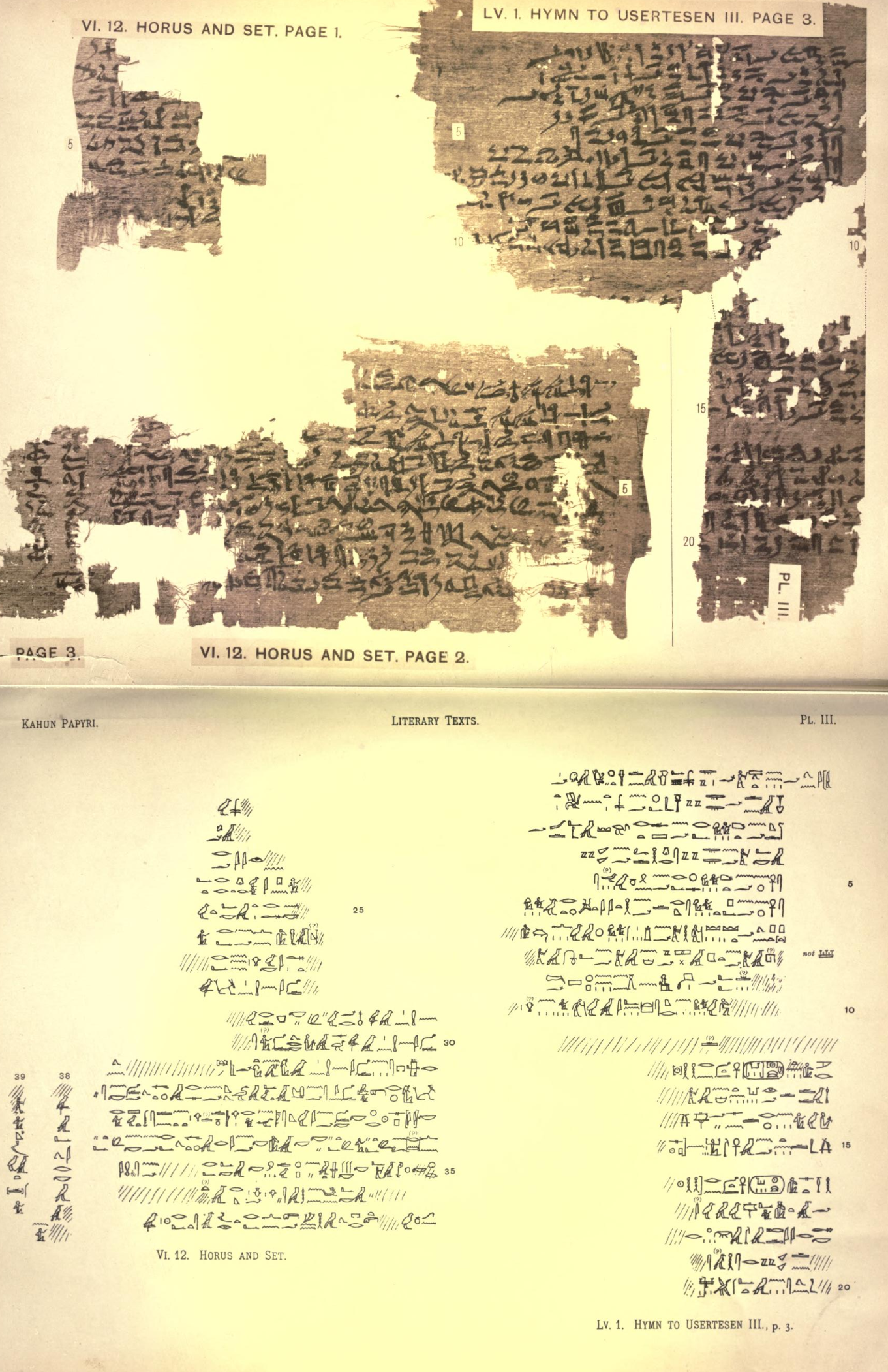
"The Majesty of Seth said to the Majesty of Horus, How beautiful are thy buttocks! How flourishing (?).... The Majesty of Horus said, Wait that I may tell it... to their palace. The Majesty of Horus said to his mother Isis... Seth desires (?) to have intercourse with me. And she said to him, Take care, do not approach him for that; when he mentions it to thee a second time, say thou to him, It is altogether too difficult for me because of (my) nature (?), since thou art too heavy for me; my strength will not be equal to thine, thou shalt say to him. Then, when he shall have given thee strength, do thou place thy fingers between thy buttocks. Lo, it will give... Lo, he will enjoy it exceedingly (?)... this seed which has come forth from his generative organ, without letting the sun see it... Come thou."

In both sexes, pleasure can be derived from the nerve endings around the anus and the anus itself, such as during anal sex. Men can achieve orgasms through prostate stimulation alone. The prostate is the male homologue (equivalent) to the Skene's glands (which are believed to be connected to the female G-spot), and can be sexually stimulated through anal sex, perineum massage or a vibrator.

Much of the available information about prostate-induced orgasms comes from anecdotal reports by individuals, and the exact mechanisms by which such orgasms are produced are unclear; some sources suggest this occurs via stimulation of nerves in the prostatic plexus surrounding the organ, others suggest it is via nerves within the prostate itself, and others say changes in the brain (neuroplasticity) are required to derive pleasure from prostate stimulation. Regardless, prostate-induced orgasms are often reported to be intensely pleasurable. Prostate stimulation can produce a deeper orgasm, described by some men as more widespread and intense, longer-lasting, and allowing for greater feelings of ecstasy than orgasm elicited by penile stimulation only. The practice of pegging (consisting of a woman penetrating a man's anus with a strap-on dildo) stimulates the prostate. It is typical for a man to not reach orgasm as a receptive partner solely from anal sex.

For women, penile–anal penetration may also indirectly stimulate the clitoris by the shared sensory nerves, especially the pudendal nerve, which gives off the inferior anal nerves and divides into the perineal nerve and the dorsal nerve of the clitoris. The G-spot area, which is considered to be interconnected with the clitoris, may also be indirectly stimulated during anal sex. Although the anus has many nerve endings, their purpose is not specifically for inducing orgasm, and so a woman achieving orgasm solely by anal stimulation is rare. Direct stimulation of the clitoris, a G-spot area, or both, while engaging in anal sex can help some women enjoy the activity and reach orgasm during it.

The aforementioned orgasms are sometimes referred to as anal orgasms, but sexologists and sex educators generally believe that orgasms derived from anal penetration are the result of the relationship between the nerves of the anus, rectum, clitoris or G-spot area in women, and the anus's proximity to the prostate and relationship between the anal and rectal nerves in men, rather than orgasms originating from the anus itself.

=== Nipple stimulation ===
For women, stimulation of the breast area during sexual intercourse or foreplay, or solely having the breasts fondled, can create mild to intense orgasms, sometimes referred to as a breast orgasm or nipple orgasm. Few women report experiencing orgasm from nipple stimulation. Before Komisaruk et al.'s fMRI research on nipple stimulation in 2011, reports of women achieving orgasm from nipple stimulation relied solely on anecdotal evidence. Komisaruk's study was the first to map the female genitals onto the sensory portion of the brain; it indicates that sensation from the nipples travels to the same part of the brain as sensations from the vagina, clitoris and cervix, and that these reported orgasms are genital orgasms caused by nipple stimulation and may be directly linked to the genital sensory cortex ("the genital area of the brain").

An orgasm is believed to occur in part because of oxytocin, which is produced in the body during sexual excitement and arousal, and labor. It has also been shown that oxytocin is produced when a man or woman's nipples are stimulated and become erect. Komisaruk also relays that preliminary data suggests that nipple nerves may directly link up with the relevant parts of the brain without uterine mediation, acknowledging the men in his study who showed the same pattern of nipple stimulation activating genital brain regions.

== Physiological aspects ==
Masters and Johnson were some of the first researchers to study the sexual response cycle in the early 1960s, based on the observation of 382 women and 312 men. They describe a cycle that begins with excitement as blood rushes into the genitals, then reaches a plateau during which they are fully aroused, which leads to orgasm, and finally resolution, in which the blood leaves the genitals.

In the 1970s, Kaplan added the category of desire to the cycle, which she argues precedes sexual excitation. She states that emotions of anxiety, defensiveness, and the failure of communication can interfere with desire and orgasm. In the late 1980s and after, Rosemary Basson proposed a more cyclical alternative to what had largely been viewed as a linear progression. In her model, desire feeds arousal and orgasm and is in turn fueled by the rest of the orgasmic cycle. Rather than orgasm being the peak of the sexual experience, she suggests that it is just one point in the circle and that people could feel sexually satisfied at any stage, reducing the focus on climax as an end goal of all sexual activity.

=== Females ===
A woman's orgasm can last slightly longer than a man's. Women's orgasms have been estimated to last on average approximately 20 seconds and to consist of a series of muscular contractions in the pelvic area that includes the vagina, the uterus, and the anus. For some women, on some occasions, these contractions begin soon after the woman reports that the orgasm has started and continue at intervals of about one second with initially increasing and then reducing intensity. In some instances, the series of regular contractions is followed by a few additional contractions or shudders at irregular intervals. In other cases, the woman reports having an orgasm, but no pelvic contractions are measured at all.

Women's orgasms are preceded by the erection of the clitoris and moistening of the opening of the vagina. Some women exhibit a sex flush, a reddening of the skin over much of the body due to increased blood flow to the skin. As a woman nears orgasm, the clitoral glans retracts under the clitoral hood, and the labia minora (inner lips) become darker. As orgasm becomes imminent, the outer third of the vagina tightens and narrows, while overall the vagina lengthens and dilates and also becomes congested from engorged soft tissue. Elsewhere in the body, myofibroblasts of the nipple-areolar complex contract, causing erection of the nipples and contraction of the areolar diameter, reaching their maximum at the start of orgasm. A woman experiences full orgasm when her uterus, vagina, anus, and pelvic muscles undergo a series of rhythmic contractions. Most women find these contractions very pleasurable.

Researchers from the University Medical Center of Groningen in the Netherlands correlated the sensation of orgasm with muscular contractions centered in the pelvis and measured in the anus, especially those occurring at a frequency of 8–13 Hz. They argue that the presence of this particular frequency of contractions can distinguish between voluntary contraction of these muscles and spontaneous involuntary contractions, and appears to more accurately correlate with orgasm as opposed to other metrics like heart rate that only measure excitation.

Since ancient times in Western Europe, women could be medically diagnosed with a disorder called female hysteria, the symptoms of which included faintness, nervousness, insomnia, fluid retention, heaviness in abdomen, muscle spasm, shortness of breath, irritability, loss of appetite for food or sex, and "a tendency to cause trouble". Women considered to have the condition would sometimes undergo "pelvic massage": stimulation of the genitals by the doctor until the woman experienced "hysterical paroxysm" (i.e., orgasm). Paroxysm was regarded as a medical treatment and not a sexual release. The disorder has ceased to be recognized as a medical condition since the 1920s.

=== Males ===
As a man nears orgasm during stimulation of the penis, he feels an intense and highly pleasurable pulsating sensation of neuromuscular euphoria. These pulsating sensations originate from the contractions of pelvic floor muscles that begin in the anal sphincters (IAS, EAS) and travel to the tip of the penis, commonly described as a "throbbing" or "tingling" sensation. They eventually increase in speed and intensity as the orgasm approaches, until a final "plateau" (the orgasmic) pleasure is sustained for several seconds.

Male orgasm process

During orgasm a male experiences rapid, rhythmic contractions of the anal sphincters (IAS, EAS), the prostate, and the bulbospongiosus muscles of the penis. The sperm are transmitted up the vasa deferentia from the testicles, into the prostate gland as well as through the seminal vesicles to produce semen. The prostate produces a secretion that forms one of the components of ejaculate. Except for in cases of a dry orgasm, contraction of the sphincter and prostate force stored semen to be expelled through the penis's urethral opening. The process takes from three to ten seconds and produces a pleasurable feeling. Ejaculation may continue for a few seconds as the euphoric sensation gradually tapers off. It is believed that the feeling of "orgasm" varies from one man to another. After ejaculation, a refractory period usually occurs, during which a man cannot achieve another orgasm. This can last anywhere from less than a minute to several hours or days, depending on age and other individual factors.

=== Brain ===
There have been very few studies correlating orgasm and brain activity in real time. One study examined 12 healthy women using a positron emission tomography (PET) scanner while they were being stimulated by their partners. Brain changes were observed and compared between states of rest, sexual stimulation, faked orgasm, and actual orgasm. Differences were reported in the brains of men and women during stimulation. Changes in brain activity were observed in both sexes, as regions associated with behavioral control, fear, and anxiety shut down. Regarding these, Gert Holstege said in an interview with The Times, "What this means is that deactivation, letting go of all fear and anxiety, might be the most important thing, even necessary, to have an orgasm."

While stroking the clitoris, the parts of the female brain responsible for processing fear, anxiety, and behavioral control start to diminish in activity. This reaches a peak at orgasm when the female brain's emotion centers are effectively closed down to produce an almost trance-like state. Holstege is quoted as saying, at the 2005 meeting of the European Society for Human Reproduction and Development, "At the moment of orgasm, women do not have any emotional feelings." A subsequent report by Rudie Kortekaas, et al. states, "Gender commonalities were most evident during orgasm... From these results, we conclude that during the sexual act, differential brain responses across genders are principally related to the stimulatory (plateau) phase and not to the orgasmic phase itself." Research has shown that as in women, the emotional centers of a man's brain also become deactivated during orgasm but to a lesser extent than in women. Brain scans of both sexes have shown that the pleasure centers of a man's brain show more intense activity than in women during orgasm. Male and female brains demonstrate similar changes during orgasm, with brain activity scans showing a temporary decrease in the metabolic activity of large parts of the cerebral cortex with normal or increased metabolic activity in the limbic areas of the brain.

EEG tracings from volunteers during orgasm were first obtained by Mosovich and Tallaferro in 1954, who recorded EEG changes resembling petit mal or the clonic phase of a grand mal seizure. Further studies in this direction were carried out by Sem-Jacobsen (1968), Heath (1972), Cohen et al. (1976), and others. Sarrel et al. reported a similar observation in 1977. These reports continue to be cited. Unlike them, Craber et al. (1985) failed to find any distinctive EEG changes in four men during masturbation and ejaculation; the authors concluded that the case for the existence of EEG changes specifically related to sexual arousal and orgasm remained unproven. Thus, experts disagree as to whether the experiment conducted by Mosovich and Tallaferro casts a new light on the nature of orgasm. In some recent studies, authors tend to adopt the opposite point of view that there are no remarkable EEG changes during ejaculation in humans.

== Health aspects of orgasm ==
=== Potential health benefits ===
Numerous studies indicate a link between frequent sexual activity, particularly orgasm, and improved health. These associations have been observed in both women and men. Research has found that sexual activity involving orgasm is associated with better sleep quality, and orgasm in women has been linked to greater relationship satisfaction. A 1997 study in the BMJ based upon 918 men aged 45–59 found that after a ten-year follow-up, men who had fewer orgasms were twice as likely to die of any cause as those having two or more orgasms per week. A follow-up in 2001 which focused more specifically on cardiovascular health found that having sex three or more times per week was associated with a 50 percent reduction in the risk of heart attack or stroke. There is some research suggesting that greater resting heart rate variability is associated with orgasms through penile-vaginal intercourse without additional simultaneous clitoral stimulation; however, most studies linking orgasm to health have examined correlations only, making it difficult to infer causality, although researchers believe that these findings suggest real benefits of orgasm and sexual activity.

=== Postorgasmic illness syndrome ===
A small percentage of men have a disease called postorgasmic illness syndrome (POIS), which causes severe muscle pain throughout the body and other symptoms immediately following ejaculation. The symptoms last for up to a week. Some doctors speculate that the frequency of POIS "in the population may be greater than has been reported in the academic literature", and that many people with POIS are undiagnosed.

=== Dysfunction and satisfaction ===
The inability to have an orgasm, or regular difficulty reaching orgasm after ample sexual stimulation, is called anorgasmia or inorgasmia. If a male experiences erection and ejaculation but no orgasm, he is said to have sexual anhedonia (a condition in which an individual cannot feel pleasure from an orgasm) or ejaculatory anhedonia. Anorgasmia is significantly more common in women than in men, which has been attributed to the lack of sex education about women's bodies, especially in sex-negative cultures, such as clitoral stimulation usually being key for women to orgasm.

Approximately 25 percent of women report difficulties with orgasm, 10% of women have never had an orgasm, and 40–50 percent have either complained about sexual dissatisfaction or experienced difficulty becoming sexually aroused at some point in their lives. A 1994 study by Laumann et al. found that 75 percent of men and 29 percent of women always had orgasms with their spouse, while 40 percent of men and 80 percent of women thought their spouse always orgasmed during sex. These rates were different in non-marital straight relationships (cohabitational, long-term and short-term heterosexual relationships), with rates increasing to 81 percent for men and 43 percent for women orgasming during sex with their short-term partners, and 69 percent for men and 83 percent for women thinking their short-term partners always orgasmed. Women are much more likely to be always or nearly always orgasmic when alone than with a partner. In a 1996 study by Davis et al., 62 percent of women in a partnered relationship said they were satisfied with the frequency/consistency of their orgasms. Additionally, some women express that their most satisfying sexual experiences entail being connected to someone, rather than solely basing satisfaction on orgasm.

Kinsey's 1953 Sexual Behavior in the Human Female shows that over the previous five years of sexual activity, 78 percent of women had orgasms in 60–100 percent of sexual encounters with other women, compared with 55 percent for heterosexual sex. Kinsey attributed this difference to female partners knowing more about women's sexuality and how to optimize women's sexual satisfaction than male partners do. Like Kinsey, scholars such as Peplau, Fingerhut, and Beals (2004) and Diamond (2006) found that lesbians have orgasms more often and more easily in sexual interactions than heterosexual women do, and that female partners are more likely to emphasize the emotional aspects of lovemaking. In contrast, research by Diane Holmberg and Karen L. Blair (2009), published in the Journal of Sex Research, found that women in same-sex relationships enjoyed identical sexual desire, sexual communication, sexual satisfaction, and satisfaction with orgasm as their heterosexual counterparts.

If orgasm is desired, anorgasmia may be attributed to an inability to relax. It may be associated with performance pressure and an unwillingness to pursue pleasure, as separate from the other person's satisfaction; often, women worry so much about the pleasure of their partner that they become anxious, which manifests as impatience with the delay of orgasm for them. This delay can lead to frustration of not reaching orgasmic sexual satisfaction. Psychoanalyst Wilhelm Reich, in his 1927 book Die Funktion des Orgasmus (published in English in 1980 as Genitality in the Theory and Therapy of Neurosis) was the first to make orgasm central to the concept of mental health, and he defined neurosis in terms of blocks to having orgastic potency. Although orgasm dysfunction can have psychological components, physiological factors often play a role. For instance, delayed orgasm or the inability to achieve orgasm is a common side effect of many medications. Specifically, with regard to simultaneous orgasm and similar practices, many sexologists claim that the idea of premature ejaculation as a problem derives from the early 20th century when mutual orgasm was overly emphasized as an objective and a sign of true sexual satisfaction in intimate relationships. Menopause may involve loss of hormones supporting sexuality and genital functionality. Vaginal and clitoral atrophy and dryness affect up to 50–60 percent of postmenopausal women. Testosterone levels in men fall as they age. Sexual dysfunction overall becomes more likely with poor physical and emotional health. "Negative experiences in sexual relationships and overall well-being" are associated with sexual dysfunction.

Research has examined orgasm function after gender-affirming hormone therapy. A 2023 study of 130 transgender women and 33 transgender men who had received gender-affirming hormone therapy for at least one year assessed self-reported orgasm function during masturbation, including time to orgasm, orgasm duration, orgasm location, orgasm satisfaction, and the post-orgasm refractory period. The study reported that transgender women had increases in time to orgasm, orgasm duration, and orgasm satisfaction after beginning hormone therapy, and that some participants reported a shift from short, single-peak orgasms to longer, multiple-peak orgasms.

==== Hyperorgasmia ====
Hyperorgasmia is the experience of a significantly larger number of orgasms in a short period of time than what is normal. It has been reported to occur as a side effect of the antidepressant drug, moclobemide.

== Theoretical biological and evolutionary functions in females ==
=== Shifts in research ===
The function or functions of the human female orgasm have been debated among researchers. Researchers have several hypotheses about the possible role of the female orgasm in the reproductive process. One argument is that female orgasm is a byproduct of shared early male ontogeny, where male orgasm is an adaptation. Research includes the sire-choice hypothesis, which proposes that female orgasm has been shaped by natural selection to function in the selection of high-quality sires (male parents) for offspring. One 1995 study indicated that female orgasm is more frequent during intercourse with a male partner with low fluctuating asymmetry. A 2012 study found a correlation between females having orgasms and the perceived masculinity and overall attractiveness of male partners. The pair bond hypothesis is a topic assessing female orgasms: a 2012 study of women who had been in both a short-term hookup and a long-term relationship reported that 67% of the women in their last sexual encounter in a long-term relationship (with a bond) had an orgasm, compared to 11% in those involved in a short-term hookup (with no bond).

=== Selective pressure and mating ===
Wallen K and Lloyd EA state, "In men, orgasms are under strong selective pressure as orgasms are coupled with ejaculation and thus contribute to male reproductive success. By contrast, women's orgasms in intercourse are highly variable and are under little selective pressure as they are not a reproductive necessity." Other authors suggest that the relative variability and difficulty of inducing orgasm in women compared to men is functional. John Wheatley and David Puts state, "If female orgasm is a mate choice mechanism, then orgasm should be triggered less easily in women than it is in men... This follows from the idea that only some males will meet females' mate selection criteria and that women have evolved to be choosier than men about mates. The latter is true specifically in mating contexts such as purely sexual relationships when male investment is minimal, and the woman may end up gestating, nursing, and caring for a child… The lower frequency of coital orgasm in women compared to men is thus consistent with what one would predict if female orgasm functions as a mate choice mechanism."

Desmond Morris suggests in his 1967 popular science book The Naked Ape that the female orgasm evolved to encourage physical intimacy with a male partner and help reinforce the pair bond. Morris suggested that the relative difficulty in achieving female orgasm, in comparison to the male's, might be favorable in Darwinian evolution by leading the female to select mates who bear qualities like patience, care, imagination, and intelligence, as opposed to qualities like size and aggression, which pertain to mate selection in other primates. Such advantageous qualities thereby become accentuated within the species, driven by the differences between male and female orgasms. If males were motivated by and taken to the point of, orgasm in the same way as females, those advantageous qualities would not be needed, since self-interest would be enough.

=== Fertility ===
There are theories that the female orgasm might increase fertility. For example, it has been suggested that the 30 percent reduction in the size of the vagina could help clench the penis (much like, or perhaps caused by, the pubococcygeus muscles), which would make it more stimulating for the male (thus ensuring faster or more voluminous ejaculation). The British biologists Baker and Bellis have suggested that the female orgasm may have a peristalsis or "upsuck" action (similar to the esophagus' ability to swallow when upside down), resulting in the retaining of favorable sperm and making conception more likely. They posited a role of female orgasm in sperm competition.

The observation that women tend to reach orgasm more easily when they are ovulating also has led to the suggestion that it is tied to increasing fertility. Evolutionary biologist Robin Baker argues in Sperm Wars that occurrence and timing of orgasms are all a part of the female body's unconscious strategy to collect and retain sperm from more evolutionary fit men. This theory suggests that an orgasm during intercourse functions as a bypass button to a woman's natural cervical filter against sperm and pathogens, and that an orgasm before functions to strengthen the filter. This suggestion that women's cycles impact orgasm is heightened by research showing that women are more likely to orgasm with partners with compatible major histocompatibility complex (MHC) genes, but only during their fertile period of ovulation.

Desmond Morris proposed that orgasm might facilitate conception by exhausting the female and keeping her horizontal, thus preventing the sperm from leaking out. This possibility, sometimes called the "Poleaxe Hypothesis" or the "Knockout Hypothesis", is now considered unlikely. A 1994 Learning Channel documentary on sex had fiber optic cameras inside the vagina of a woman while she had sexual intercourse. During her orgasm, her pelvic muscles contracted and her cervix repeatedly dipped into a pool of semen in the vaginal fornix, which might ensure that sperm would proceed by the external orifice of the uterus, making conception more likely.

Evolutionary psychologists Christopher Ryan and Cacilda Jethá, in their discussion of the female orgasm, address how long it takes for females to achieve orgasm compared to males, and females' ability to have multiple orgasms, hypothesizing how especially well suited to multiple partners and insemination this is. They quote primate sexuality specialist Alan Dixson in saying that the monogamy-maintenance explanation for female orgasm "seems far-fetched" because "females of other primate species, and particularly those with multimale-multifemale [promiscuous] mating systems such as macaques and chimpanzees, exhibit orgasmic responses in the absence of such bonding or the formation of stable family units." On the other hand, Dixson states that "Gibbons, which are primarily monogamous, do not exhibit obvious signs of female orgasm."

Consistent with this view, Puts, Dawood, and Welling in "Why women have orgasms: An evolutionary analysis", review evidence from species of nonhuman primates in which multiple possible behavioral correlates of orgasm have been reported and note that "the majority of nonhuman primate species… in which female orgasm appears to exist have been reported to exhibit multi-male social structures, though it should be noted that multimale sociality is common in anthropoid primates generally." The female promiscuity explanation of female sexuality was echoed at least 12 years earlier by other evolutionary biologists, and there is increasing scientific awareness of the female proceptive phase. Though Dixson classifies humans as mildly polygynous in his survey of primate sexuality, he appears to have doubts, when he writes, "One might argue that ... the female's orgasm is rewarding, increases her willingness to copulate with a variety of males rather than one partner, and thus promotes sperm competition." Ryan and Jethá use this as evidence for their theory that partible paternity and promiscuity was common for early modern humans. Wheatley and Puts note in "Evolutionary Science of Female Orgasm", that females with a more secure attachment style had a higher chance of orgasm with a partner, and in females more open to uncommitted sex report a higher chance of orgasm in a short- term hookup. These findings suggest that the functions of female orgasm may be facultative, used for either conception~~,~~ in those more open to uncommitted sex, or pair bonding for those looking for a deeper attachment.

=== Adaptive or vestigial ===
The clitoris is homologous to the penis; that is, they both develop from the same embryonic structure. While researchers such as Geoffrey Miller, Helen Fisher, Meredith Small and Sarah Blaffer Hrdy "have viewed the clitoral orgasm as a legitimate adaptation in its own right, with major implications for female sexual behavior and sexual evolution," others, such as Donald Symons and Stephen Jay Gould, have asserted that the clitoris is vestigial or nonadaptive and that the female orgasm serves no particular evolutionary function. Gould acknowledged that "most female orgasms emanate from a clitoral, rather than vaginal (or some other), site" and stated that his nonadaptive belief "has been widely misunderstood as a denial of either the adaptive value of female orgasm in general or even as a claim that female orgasms lack significance in some broader sense". He explained that although he accepts that "clitoral orgasm plays a pleasurable and central role in female sexuality and its joys," "[a]ll these favorable attributes, however, emerge just as clearly and just as easily, whether the clitoral site of orgasm arose as a spandrel or an adaptation". He said that the "male biologists who fretted over [the adaptionist questions] simply assumed that a deeply vaginal site, nearer the region of fertilization, would offer greater selective benefit" due to their Darwinian, summum bonum beliefs about enhanced reproductive success.

Regarding the notion that the smaller size and greater variability in clitoral compared to penile length shed light on a possible adaptive function of female orgasm, Puts, Dawood, and Welling state, "whereas both clitorises and penises are important in orgasm, penises also function in urination and are intermittent organs necessary for insemination. These additional roles mean that whatever selective pressures operated on clitorises and penises for orgasmic potential, overall selection on these two organs certainly differed. Thus, variability in penile and clitoral dimensions simply cannot shed light on the relative strengths of selection specifically on male and female orgasmic potential."

Proponents of the nonadaptive hypothesis, such as Elisabeth Lloyd, refer to the relative difficulty of achieving female orgasm through vaginal sex, the limited evidence for increased fertility after orgasm, and the lack of statistical correlation between the capacity of a woman to orgasm and the likelihood that she will engage in intercourse. "Lloyd is by no means against evolutionary psychology. Quite the opposite; in her methods and in her writing, she advocates and demonstrates a commitment to the careful application of evolutionary theory to the study of human behavior," stated Meredith L. Chivers. She added that Lloyd "meticulously considers the theoretical and empirical bases for each account and ultimately concludes that there is little evidence to support an adaptionist account of female orgasm" and that Lloyd instead "views female orgasm as an ontogenetic leftover; women have orgasms because the urogenital neurophysiology for orgasm is so strongly selected for in males that this developmental blueprint gets expressed in females without affecting fitness, just as males have nipples that serve no fitness-related function".

A 2005 twin study found that one in three women reported never or seldom achieving orgasm during sexual intercourse, and only one in ten always orgasmed. This variation in the ability to orgasm, generally thought to be psychosocial, was found to be 34 percent to 45 percent genetic. The study, examining 4000 women, was published in Biology Letters, a Royal Society journal. Elisabeth Lloyd has cited this as evidence for the notion that female orgasm is not adaptive. According to Puts, Dawood and Welling, "Much of the variation among women in orgasm frequencies likely results from the facultative nature of orgasm—not all sexual stimulation is equal." Because sexual experiences cannot be assumed equal across female, one cannot dismiss an adaptive basis of female orgasm on those bases.

Miller, Hrdy, Helen O'Connell, and Natalie Angier have criticized the "female orgasm is vestigial" hypothesis as understating and devaluing the psychosocial value of the female orgasm. Hrdy stated that the hypothesis smacks of sexism. O'Connell said, "It boils down to rivalry between the sexes: the idea that one sex is sexual and the other reproductive. The truth is that both are sexual and both are reproductive." O'Connell used MRI technology to define the true size and shape of the clitoris, suggesting that it extends into the anterior wall of the vagina (see above). O'Connell describes typical textbook descriptions of the clitoris as lacking detail and including inaccuracies, saying that the work of Georg Ludwig Kobelt in the early 19th century provides a most comprehensive and accurate description of clitoral anatomy. She argues that the bulbs appear to be part of the clitoris and that the distal urethra and vagina are intimately related structures, although they are not erectile in character, forming a tissue cluster with the clitoris that appears to be the center of female sexual function and orgasm. By contrast, Nancy Tuana, at the 2002 conference for Canadian Society of Women in Philosophy, argues that the clitoris is unnecessary in reproduction, but that this is why it has been "historically ignored", mainly because of "a fear of pleasure. It is pleasure separated from reproduction. That's the fear". She reasoned that this fear is the cause of the ignorance that veils female sexuality.

=== Induced ovulation ===
Some spontaneously ovulating species can occasionally undergo mating-induced preovulatory LH surges. These species require mating to stimulate the vagina and cervix, resulting in ovulation in the females. Research suggests that the female orgasm evolved from copulation-induced ovulation.

=== Fringe theories ===
Brody Costa et al. suggest that women's vaginal orgasm consistency is associated with being told in childhood or adolescence that the vagina is the important zone for inducing female orgasms. Other proposed factors include how well women focus mentally on vaginal sensations during penile-vaginal intercourse, the greater duration of intercourse, and their preference for above-average penis length. Costa theorizes that vaginal orgasm is more prevalent among women with a prominent tubercle of the upper lip. His research indicates that "[a] prominent and sharply raised lip tubercle has been associated with greater odds (odds ratio = 12.3) of ever having a vaginal orgasm, and also with greater past month vaginal orgasm consistency (an effect driven by the women who never had a vaginal orgasm), than less prominent lip tubercle categories." Lip tubercle was not associated with social desirability responding, or with orgasm triggered by masturbation during penile-vaginal sex, solitary or partner clitoral or vaginal masturbation, vibrator use, or cunnilingus.

An empirical study carried out in 2008 provides evidence for Freud's implied link between the inability to have a vaginal orgasm and psychosexual immaturity. In the study, women reported their past month's frequency of different sexual behaviors and corresponding orgasm rates and completed the Defense Style Questionnaire (DSQ-40), which is associated with various psychopathologies. The study concluded that a "vaginal orgasm was associated with less somatization, dissociation, displacement, autistic fantasy, devaluation, and isolation of affect." Moreover, "vaginally anorgasmic women had immature defenses scores comparable to those of established (depression, social anxiety disorder, panic disorder, and obsessive–compulsive disorder) outpatient psychiatric groups." In the study, a vaginal orgasm (as opposed to a clitoral orgasm) was defined as being triggered solely by penile–vaginal intercourse. According to Wilhelm Reich, the lack of women's capacity to have a vaginal orgasm is due to a lack of orgastic potency, which he believed to be the result of culture's suppression of genital sexuality.

== Involuntariness ==
Medical research shows that the genital reflex is also regulated by the spinal cord and not necessarily under conscious control. An involuntary orgasm may occur as the result of sexual assault or rape, which may result in feelings of shame caused by internalization of victim-blaming attitudes. The incidence of those who experience unsolicited sexual contact and experience orgasm is very low, though possibly under-reported due to shame or embarrassment of the victim. Such orgasms may happen to either sex. An unwanted orgasm may arise from a persistent genital arousal disorder. In consensual BDSM play, forced orgasm may be practiced to exercise orgasm control.

== Tantric sex ==
Tantric sex, which is not the same as Buddhist tantra (Vajrayana), is the ancient Indian spiritual tradition of sexual practices. It attributes a different value to orgasm than traditional cultural approaches to sexuality. Some practitioners of tantric sex aim to eliminate orgasm from sexual intercourse by remaining for a long time in the pre-orgasmic and non-emission state. Advocates of this, such as Rajneesh, claim that it eventually causes orgasmic feelings to spread out to all of one's conscious experience. Advocates of tantric and neo-tantric sex who claim that Western culture focuses too much on the goal of climactic orgasm, which reduces the ability to have intense pleasure during other moments of the sexual experience, suggest that eliminating this enables a richer, fuller, and more intense connection.

== Literature ==
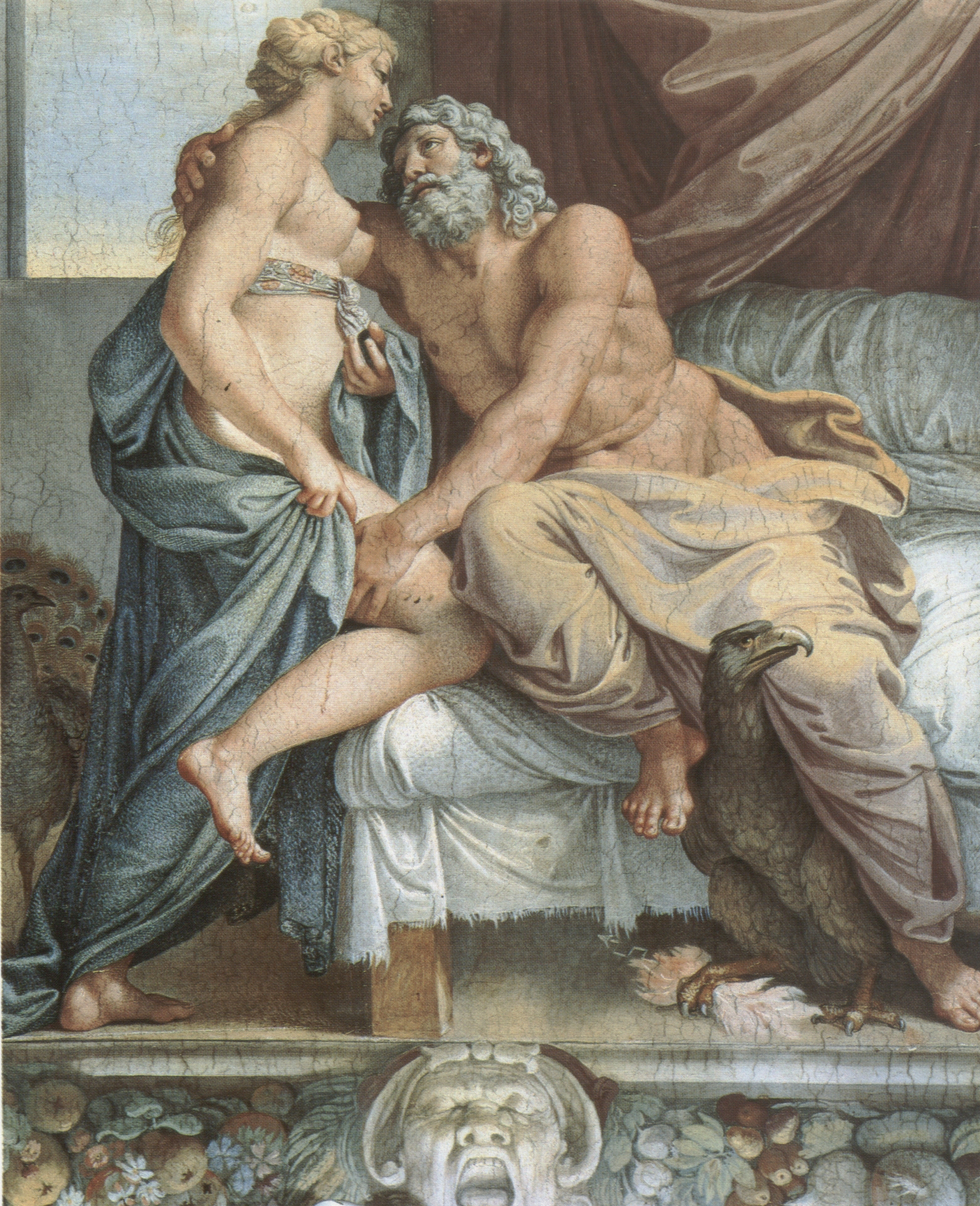
Jupiter and Juno, by Annibale Carracci

Orgasm has been widely described in literature over the centuries. In antiquity, Latin literature addressed the subject as much as Greek literature: Book III of Ovid's Metamorphoses retells a discussion between Jove and Juno, in which the former states: "The sense of pleasure in the male is far / More dull and dead than what you females share." Juno rejects this thought; they agree to ask the opinion of Tiresias ("who had known Venus/Love in both ways," having lived seven years as a female). Tiresias offends Juno by agreeing with Jove, and she strikes him blind on the spot (Jove lessens the blow by giving Tiresias the gift of foresight, and long life). Earlier, in the Ars Amatoria, Ovid states that he abhors sexual intercourse that fails to complete both partners.

The theme of orgasm survived during Romanticism and is incorporated in many homoerotic works. In FRAGMENT: Supposed to be an Epithalamium of Francis Ravaillac and Charlotte Cordé, Percy Bysshe Shelley, "a translator of extraordinary range and versatility", wrote the phrase "No life can equal such a death." That phrase has been seen as a metaphor for orgasm, and it was preceded by the rhythmic urgency of the previous lines "Suck on, suck on, I glow, I glow!", which has been seen as alluding to fellatio. For Shelley, orgasm was "the almost involuntary consequences of a state of abandonment in the society of a person of surpassing attractions".

Edward Ellerker Williams, the last love of Shelley's life, was remembered by the poet in "The Boat on the Serchio", which has been considered as possibly "the grandest portrayal of orgasm in literature". In this poem, Shelley associates orgasm with death when he writes "the death which lovers love". In French literature, the term la petite mort (the little death) is a famous euphemism for orgasm; it is the representation of the man who forgets himself and the world during orgasm. Jorge Luis Borges, in the same vision, wrote in one of the several footnotes of "Tlön, Uqbar, Orbis Tertius" that one of the churches of Tlön claims Platonically that "All men, in the vertiginous moment of coitus, are the same man. All men who repeat a line from Shakespeare are William Shakespeare." Shakespeare himself was knowledgeable of this idea, as lines "I will live in thy heart, die in thy lap, and be buried in thy eyes" and "I will die bravely, like a smug bridegroom", said respectively by Benedick in Much Ado About Nothing and by King Lear in the play of that ilk, are interpreted as allusions to orgasm: "to die in a woman's lap" = "to experience a sexual orgasm".

Freud, in his psychoanalytic projects, such as The Ego and the Id (1923), speculates that sexual satisfaction by orgasm makes Eros ("life instinct") exhausted and leaves the field open to Thanatos ("death instinct"). In other words, with orgasm Eros fulfills its mission and gives way to Thanatos. Other modern authors have chosen to represent the orgasm without metaphors. In the novel Lady Chatterley's Lover (1928), by D. H. Lawrence, features an explicit narrative of a sexual act between a couple: "As he began to move, in the sudden helpless orgasm there awoke in her strange thrills rippling inside her..." Robert Macfarlane, in a review of the Jilly Cooper novel Pandora, discussed how it has an increased ratio of sex per page than her earlier novels, such as Riders, and that the sex is usually simple and happy, where "mutuality of orgasm is a given". He also pointed out that in Pandora there is a far greater range of sexual activities described than in other Cooper novels, that are not just vaginal penetration by a penis.

== Other animals ==
The mechanics of male orgasm are similar in most male mammals. Females of all mammal and some non-mammal species, such as alligators, have clitorises. There has been ongoing research about the sexuality of dolphins, one of many species which engage in sexual intercourse for reasons other than reproduction. The duration of orgasm varies considerably among different mammal species.

== See also ==
- Birthgasm
- Child sexuality
- Coitus reservatus
- Eroto-comatose lucidity
- Female ejaculation
- Female sexual arousal disorder
- Forced orgasm – a BDSM term
- Kama Sutra – an ancient text on human sexual behavior
- La petite mort – "the little death" in French (a euphemism for orgasm)
- Orgasm gap
- Persistent genital arousal disorder
- Sex position
- Sexual function
- Venus Butterfly
