= Orgastic potency =

Concept coined by Austrian psychoanalyst Wilhelm Reich

Within the work of the Austrian psychoanalyst Wilhelm Reich (1897–1957), orgastic potency is a human's natural ability to experience an orgasm with certain psychosomatic characteristics and resulting in full sexual gratification.

For Reich, "orgastic impotence" is an acquired fear of sexual excitation, resulting in the inability to find full sexual gratification (not to be confused with anorgasmia, the inability to reach orgasm). This always resulted in neurosis, according to Reich, because that person could never discharge all built-up libido, which Reich regarded as actual biological or bioelectric energy. According to Reich, "not a single neurotic individual possesses orgastic potency" and, inversely, all people free from neuroses have orgastic potency.

Reich coined the term orgastic potency in 1924 and described the concept in his 1927 book Die Funktion des Orgasmus, the manuscript of which he presented to Sigmund Freud on the latter's 70th birthday. Though Reich regarded his work as complementing Freud's original theory of anxiety neurosis, Freud was ambivalent in his reception. Freud's view was that there was no single cause of neurosis.

Reich continued to use the concept as a foundation of a person's psychosexual health in his later therapeutic methods, such as character analysis and vegetotherapy. During the period 1933–1937, he attempted to ground his orgasm theory in physiology, both theoretically and experimentally, as he published in the articles: The Orgasm as an Electrophysiological Discharge (1934), Sexuality and Anxiety: The Basic Antithesis of Vegetative Life (1934) and The Bioelectrical Function of Sexuality and Anxiety (1937).

== Background ==
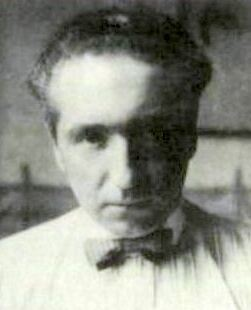
Wilhelm Reich

Reich developed his orgasm theory between 1921 and 1924 and it formed the basis for much of his later work, including the theory of character analysis. The starting point of Reich's orgasm theory was his clinical observation of genital disturbance in all neurotics, which he presented in November 1923, in the paper "Über Genitalität vom Standpunkt der psychoanalytischen Prognose und Therapie" ("Genitality from the viewpoint of psycho-analytic prognosis and therapy"). That presentation was met with a chilling silence, much hostility, and was partially discredited because Reich could not adequately define normal sexual health. In response, and after a further year of research, Reich introduced the concept "orgastic potency" at the 1924 Psycho-analytic Congress, Salzburg in the paper "Die therapeutische Bedeutung des Genitallibidos" ("Further Remarks on the Therapeutic Significance of Genital Libido").

In addition to his own patients' love lives, Reich had examined through interviews and case records of 200 patients seen at the Vienna Psychoanalytic Polyclinic. Reich was impressed by the depth and frequency of genital disturbances he observed. One example was a patient who had reported having a normal sex life, but on closer interviewing by Reich revealed not experiencing orgasm during intercourse and having thoughts of murdering her partner following the act. Such observations made Reich very suspicious of superficial reports about sexual experience. His analysis of these cases led Reich to three conclusions:

1. Severe genital disturbance was present in all cases of neurosis,
2. The severity of the genital disturbance correlated to the severity of the neurosis, and
3. All patients who improved in therapy and remained symptom-free achieved a gratifying genital sex life.

This led Reich to establish criteria for satisfactory sexual intercourse. Based on interviews with people who appeared to have satisfactory sex lives, he described the sex act as being optimally satisfactory only if it follows a specific pattern. Orgastic potency is Reich's term for the ability to have this maximally fulfilling type of sexual experience, which in the Reichian view is limited to those who are free from neuroses and appears to be shared by all people free of neuroses.

Reich distinguished between complete release of accumulated sexual tensions in orgasm, resulting in the restoration of energy equilibrium, and orgastic impotence, in which the release of energy is incomplete. Reich argued that the inability of psychoneurotics to wholly discharge sexual energy caused a damming-up of sexual energy, providing in real-time the physiological 'energy stasis' underlying the neurosis, with the psyche merely providing the historical content of the neurosis, but which could not exist without the accompanying energy stasis.

== Definitions ==
Reich's precise definition for the phrase "orgastic potency" changed over time as he changed his understanding of the phenomenon. He first described it in detail in his 1927 book Die Funktion Des Orgasmus. In the 1980 English translation of the book, Genitality in the Theory and Therapy of Neuroses, he defined orgastic potency as "the ability to achieve full resolution of existing sexual need-tension".

In his 1940 book Die Entdeckung des Orgons Erster Teil: Die Function des Orgasmus, published in English in 1942 as The Discovery of the Orgone, Volume 1: The Function of the Orgasm, he defined it as "the capacity to surrender to the flow of biological energy, free of any inhibitions; the capacity to discharge completely the dammed-up sexual excitation through involuntary, pleasurable convulsions of the body."

His last published definition of orgastic potency, which is repeated in his 1960 published Selected Writings, is "the capacity for complete surrender to the involuntary convulsion of the organism and complete discharge of the excitation at the acme of the genital embrace."

Reich related orgastic potency and orgastic impotence to a, respectively, healthy and unhealthy sexual experience for the adult. He described that the healthy experience has specific biological and psychological characteristics; is identical for men and women; is characterised by love and the ability to express it; full, deep, pleasurable breathing is present; deep, delicious current-like sensations run up and down the body shortly before orgasm; and involuntary muscular movements are present before climax. Moreover, Reich defined the healthy sexual experience exclusively in terms of the sexual union between male and female. The difference between the presence and absence of orgastic potency in the sexual encounter, as described by Reich, is summarised by Boadella as follows:

Reich's classification of phases	Orgastic potency	Orgastic impotence	Phases of development of excitation (Boadella)
Voluntary phase	"Biological readiness. 'Calm excitement.' Mutual pleasurable anticipation."	"Over- or under-excitement. 'Cold' erection. 'Dry' vagina. Foreplay insufficient or over-prolonged."	1. Foreplay
Voluntary phase	"Preceded by a spontaneous urge to enter, or to be entered by, the partner."	"Either: sadistic piercing by the man and rape fantasy by the woman. Or: fear of penetrating or of being penetrated and decrease of pleasure at penetration."	2. Penetration
Voluntary phase	"Movements are voluntary but effortless and rhythmical, unhurried and gentle. Extraneous thoughts are absent; there is absorption in the experience. Pleasurable sensations continue to increase. Periods of rest do not lead to a decrease of pleasure."	"Violent friction, nervous haste. Extraneous thoughts or fantasies are compulsively present. Pre-occupation with sense of duty to one's partner and fear of 'failure' or determination to 'succeed'. Period of rest likely to lead to a sharp drop in excitation."	3. Voluntary phase of sexual movements
Involuntary phase	"Excitation leads to involuntary contractions of the genital musculature (which precede ejaculation in the man and lead to the acme). The total body musculature participates with lively contractions as the excitation flows back from the genital to the body. 'Melting' sensations in the body. Clouding of consciousness at the acme."	"Involuntary movements greatly reduced or in some cases absent altogether. Sensations remain localised in the genital and do not spread to the body as a whole. Involuntary responses may be simulated for the benefit of the partner. Squeezing and pushing, with spastic contraction, to achieve a climax. Head remains in control and the clouding of consciousness is absent."	4. Involuntary phases of muscle contractions
Involuntary phase	"Pleasant bodily and mental relaxation. Feeling of harmony with partner. Strong desire for rest or sleep. 'After-glow'."	"Feelings of leaden exhaustion, disgust, repulsion, indifference or hatred towards partner. Excitation not fully discharged, sometimes leading to insomnia. Omne animal post coitum triste est."	5. Phase of relaxation

== Recurrence in Reich's work ==
Reich expanded on the concept throughout his career. In his 1942 scientific autobiography The Discovery of Orgone, Vol. 1: The Function of the Orgasm, Reich provided the following summary of his findings regarding orgastic potency: it is an outcome of health, he argued, because full orgastic potency can only come about if a person is psychologically free of neurosis (pleasure anxiety absent), physically free from "body armor" (chronic muscular contraction absent), socially free from compulsive morality and duty as imposed by authoritarian and mechanistic ways of life, and has the natural ability to love. According to one source, Reich held that the vast majority of people do not meet these criteria and thus lack orgastic potency.

=== Character analysis ===
In Reichian psychology, the individual lacking orgastic potency is seen to have developed a neurotic psychosomatic "armor" that blocks the experience of pleasure. This is differentiated between the functionally identical "character armor" and "muscular armor". Muscular armor prevents the sexual climax from being experienced throughout the body. For example, forms of armoring are pulling back the pelvis or tightening the thigh and buttock muscles.

Reich used the terms "genital character" and "neurotic character" respectively to distinguish between two ideal character types: one with and one without orgastic potency. The genital character is the non-neurotic character structure, which is free from armor and, therefore, has the capacity of natural sexual and moral self-regulation, and experiences life as a fulfilment and unfolding of his or her natural tendencies and struggle to achieve objectives. The neurotic character operates under a principle of compulsive moral regulation due to chronic energy stasis. The neurotic character's work and life is permeated by struggle to suppress original and even more basic urges or tendencies. The various forms of neurotic character correspond to the equally many ways of suppressing such urges or tendencies that the human being in question considers to be dangerous or is ashamed of.

=== Therapeutic resolving of armor ===
The two goals of Reichian vegetotherapy are the attainment of orgastic potency (for sexual intercourse) and of the "orgasm reflex" during therapy. The orgasm reflex may be observed as waves of pleasure moving through the body, a series of spontaneous, involuntary movements, and signifies that the person is free of body armoring, entailing the ability to give and receive love in all its forms.

=== Prevention through social reform ===
The Invasion of Compulsory Sex-Morality, written in 1931, was Reich's first step in approaching the answer to the problem of mass neuroses in society, followed by The Mass Psychology of Fascism and The Sexual Revolution. The primary sociological issues with which Reich dealt included in particular the following three:

1. How to prevent neurosis through correct upbringing and education.
2. How to prevent sex-negative attitudes in society through sexual reform.
3. How to prevent authoritarian repression through general social reform.

=== Bio-electric experiments ===
In 1934, Reich expanded his orgasm theory in the essay "Der Orgasmus als Elektro-physiologische Entladung" ("The Orgasm as an Electrophysiological Discharge"). Through clinical observations in his sex-counseling centers, Reich concluded that conceiving of the orgasm as only mechanical tension and relaxation could not explain why some experience gratification and others do not. Thus, based on the work of Friedrich Kraus and others, Reich proposed that the orgasm is a bio-electric discharge, and is part of what Reich termed the orgasm formula:

mechanical tension > bioelectric charge > bioelectric discharge > mechanical relaxation.

In 1934, Reich published the paper "Der Urgegensatz des Vegetatives Lebens" ("Sexuality and Anxiety: The Basic Antithesis of Vegetative Life"). The paper is a literature study in which Reich explored "the physiology of the autonomic nervous system, the chemistry of anxiety, the electro-physiology of the body fluids and the hydro-mechanics of plasma movements in protozoa". In conclusion, Reich proposed a functional psychosomatic antithesis between the parasympathetic and sympathetic nervous systems, captured respectively as pleasure or movement "towards the world", and anxiety or movement "away from the world". The corollary is the idea that bioelectric energy displayed an antithetic function: if it flows outward to the skin surface, causing a build-up of charge at the skin, it is experienced as pleasure; in contrast, if it flows inward, away from the skin surface, resulting in a lowering of charge at the skin, then it is experienced as an increase in central tension or anxiety.

Finally, in 1937 Reich published Experimentelle Ergebnisse über die elektrische Funktion von Sexualitat und Angst (The Bioelectrical Function of Sexuality and Anxiety) in which he thought he experimentally verified the existence of what he first termed the "libidinal economy". The report summarised two years of research into the reaction of the skin to states of pleasure and anxiety. His claimed findings included the following: normal skin has a constant, basic electrical charge of 40 millivolts that does not change with mood states; erogenous zones have a wandering potential that can at times be much higher (200 millivolts) or lower, depending on the mood states; change in potential does not depend on the mechanical nature of the stimulus, but on changes in the subject's sensation or emotion; and, erogenous zones can have mechanical tension (be tumescent) without changes in levels of the charge, e.g. as in the case of a "cold erection".

=== Orgone energy ===
A common misconception about Reich's later developed orgone energy accumulator is that he claimed it could provide orgastic potency to those sitting inside the device. As Reich put it, "The orgone accumulator, as has been clearly stated in the relevant publications (The Cancer Biopathy, etc.), cannot provide orgastic potency."

== Reception ==
=== Academic and psychoanalytic reception ===
According to Myron Sharaf, Reich's view that the capacity to unite tender and sensuous feelings is important for a healthy love relationship was not a new concept. Freud had noted this as early as 1912. However, Sharaf states that the involuntary physical aspects of the full genital discharge in Reich's work were new. He called the concept orgastic potency and the manner in which Reich "connected a series of psychological, social, and biological findings with the presence or absence of this function" unique to Reich.

When Reich first introduced the orgasm theory at the psychoanalytic congress in Salzburg he was congratulated by Karl Abraham for successfully formulating the economic element of neurosis. However, Reich's presentation of the orgasm theory came exactly when psychoanalysis was moving away from the original Freudian instinct theory based on psychic energy. In his 1926 book Inhibitions, Symptoms, Anxiety Freud completely abandoned his earlier position and wrote: "Anxiety never arises from repressed libido."

Freud was ambivalent in his reception. When Reich presented him the manuscript of Die Funktion des Orgasmus in May 1926, Freud replied, "That thick?" Later that year he wrote to Reich that the book was "valuable, rich in observation and thought", but in May 1928 wrote to Lou Andreas-Salomé: "We have here a Dr. Reich, a worthy but impetuous young man, passionately devoted to his hobby-horse, who now salutes in the genital orgasm the antidote to every neurosis. Perhaps he might learn from your analysis of K. to feel some respect for the complicated nature of the psyche."

Reich was strongly influenced by Freud's distinction between psychoneuroses and actual neuroses, the latter being considered of a physiological origin, and the related libido as the energy of an unconscious sexual instinct. However, Reich emphasised the libido theory exactly when it was being discarded by psychoanalysis. Freud had reasoned that sexual maladaption caused the active damming-up of "sexual stuff" and defined "actual neurosis" as anxiety based on dammed-up libido. However, Freud abandoned his view in the 1920s and postulated the never popularly accepted death instinct to explain the destructive behaviour that was earlier attributed to frustrated libido. Reich's view of the relationship between actual and psychoneuroses has not found its way into psychoanalytic thinking. However, it has the advantage of connecting psychopathology with physiology and, according to Charles Rycroft, this makes Reich the only psychoanalyst to provide any explanation as to why childhood pathogenic experiences (causing neuroses in classical psychoanalysis) do not disappear when neurotics leave their childhood environment.

Sharaf writes that the theory was immediately unpopular within psychoanalysis. Paul Federn, Reich's training assistant, and Hermann Nunberg were particularly opposed to it. The German psychiatrist Arthur Kronfeld (1886–1941) wrote a positive review of Die Funktion des Orgasmus in 1927: "In this extremely valuable and instructive work the author has really succeeded in broadening as well as deepening Freud's theory of sex and of the neuroses. He broadens it by clarifying for the first time the significance of the genital orgasm for the development and the whole structure of the neuroses; he deepens it by giving Freud's theory of the actual neuroses an exact psychological and physiological meaning. I do not hesitate to consider this work of Reich's the most valuable contribution since Freud's The Ego and the Id." The most prominent Freudian to make clinical use of the concept orgastic potency was Eduard E. Hitschmann (1871–1957), the Director of the Psychoanalytic Polyclinic.

Two further reactions to Reich's work in the psychoanalytic movement were either completely ignoring it or using the concept as if it was commonly accepted, but without referring to Reich as the source. As a result, the theme orgastic potency survived, but became divorced from the concepts in which Reich embedded it. For example Charles Berg (1892–1957), in his Clinical Psychology - A Case Book of the Neuroses and their Treatment (1948), uses Reich's sex economic theory of anxiety as his own, without attributing it to Reich. Erik Erikson was another psychoanalytic writer who partially adopted Reich's concept without acknowledgement. In his bestselling Childhood and Society, Erikson wrote: "Genitality, then, consists in the unobstructed capacity to develop an orgastic potency so free of pregenital interferences that the genital libido ... is expressed in heterosexual mutuality ... and with a convulsion-like discharge of tension from the whole body."

Otto Fenichel, in the classic textbook The Psychoanalytic Theory of Neuroses, uses aspects of Reich's orgasm theory but disguised that they were Reich's contribution, and furthermore he hid the conflicts in the psychoanalytic movement that were explicit in Reich's work. A major entry mainly based on Fenichel's work appeared in the 1953, 1970 Psychiatric Dictionary by L. Hinsie and R. Campbell: "Impotence, orgastic: The incapacity for achieving the orgasm or acme of satisfaction in the sexual act. Many neurotics cannot achieve adequate discharge of their sexual energy through the sexual act ... According to Fenichel, an important concomitant of orgastic impotence is that these patients are incapable of love."

As of September 2012, there are no peer-reviewed articles in the PubMed database that discuss the concept of orgastic potency or Reich's orgasm theory.

=== Reichian legacy ===
The two colleagues of Reich who build most on Reich's orgasm theory and orgastic potency are Danish psychiatrist Tage Philipson (1907–1961) and Alexander Lowen (1910–2008). They emphasised the importance of human relationship in orgastic functions.

Tage Philipson, in his 1952 book Kaerlighedslivet: Natur Eller Unnatur, studied natural and unnatural love-life. He wrote that "in healthy people sexuality and love will always be associated together. Sex will come from the heart and return to the heart ... the fully healthy person must be the person with completely free love feelings ... When this is the case other feelings will also be able to stream through the entire organism: hate, sorrow, anxiety, etc., and the orgasm, as the highest point of sexuality, will also be able to affect the entire organism."

Alexander Lowen, in his 1966 book Love and Orgasm, distinguishes between achieving orgasm in the Kinsey meaning of sexual performance, and the entering into a love relationship as a whole human, similar to Reich. Like Reich, Lowen considers the latter to be the expression of health, not a means to it.

Theodore Peter Wolfe (Theodor Peter Wolfensberger) (1902–1954), an American pioneer in psychosomatic medicine and later colleague of Reich, thought that anxiety was the cause of both neuroses and psychosomatic distortions. When reading Reich's Der Funktion des Orgasmus he found in it what he called the key to understanding the dynamics of this relationship.

In a review of Reich's sexual theories Elsworth Fredrick Baker (1903–1985), a psychiatrist and colleague of Reich, wrote that in particular Reich's sexual theories were commonly misinterpreted and misunderstood. While Reich was portrayed as advocating "a wild frantic promiscuity" to seek "mystical, ecstatic orgasm" that could cure all neuroses and physical ills, Baker continues, Reich in fact found that the healthy person needs less sexual activity and that the orgasm has a function to maintain health only for the healthy person.

== Comparing definitions of orgasm ==
The concepts of the sexual acme used in the 1948 and 1953 Kinsey reports and the 1966 research by Masters and Johnson were different from the one used by Reich. Reich directly related orgastic potency with the total response system, the personality, contact-ability, total psychosomatic health of a person. In contrast, Kinsey and Masters and Johnson restricted their conclusions to phenomena that all sexual climaxes had in common. For example, Kinsey defined the male orgasm as "all cases of ejaculation" and the female orgasm as "the sudden and abrupt release ... from sexual tension, [excluding] the satisfaction that may result from sexual experience." In other words, Kinsey focusses on the physiology, anatomy and technique involved in inducing a discharge of tension. Therefore, Kinsey's usage of the term orgasm covers behaviour that in the Reichian typology ranges from orgastic potency to orgastic impotence. Furthermore, examples of physiological distinctions Reich made but which were not pursued by Kinsey and Masters and Johnson include the difference between local and total bodily responses, and between voluntary and involuntary movements.

=== Mature orgasm ===
In 1905, Freud developed the psychoanalytic distinction between clitoral and vaginal orgasm, with only the latter being identified with psychosexual maturity. This distinction has since been challenged among others on physiological grounds. For example, Masters and Johnson wrote: "Are clitoral and vaginal orgasms truly separate and anatomic entities? From a biological point of view the answer to this question is an unequivocal NO." However, a clinically grounded qualitative distinction between psychosexual maturity and immaturity was only introduced with Reich's concept orgastic potency vs. orgastic impotence (instead of vaginal vs. clitoral). As Masters and Johnson focussed on phenomena shared by all sexual climaxes – ranging from what Reich categorised as orgastic potency to impotence – their finding has no direct relevance to or implications for Reich's distinction.

== Works by Wilhelm Reich ==
Sexology

- 1921: "Der Koitus und die Geschlechter", Zeitschrift für Sexualwissenschaft 8. Republished in English in 1975 as "Coition and the Sexes", Early Writings, Vol. 1, New York: FSG: 73–85, ISBN 0374513473.
- 1922: "Triebbegriffe von Forel bis Jung," Zeitschrift für Sexualwissenschaft 9. Republished in English in 1975 as "Drive and Libido Concepts from Forel to Jung" in Early Writings, Vol. 1, New York: FSG: 86–124, ISBN 0374513473.
- 1923: "Zür Triebenergetik," Zeitschrift für Sexualwissenschaft 10. Republished in English in 1975 as "Concerning the Energy of Drives" in Early Writings, Vol. 1, New York: FSG: 143–157, ISBN 0374513473.

Psychoanalysis In the following articles Reich discussed the positive and negative therapeutic reactions of patients to changes in their genitality:

- 1922: "Über Spezifität der Onanieformen", Internationale Zeitschrift für Psychoanalyse 8. Republished in English in 1975 as "Concerning Specific Forms of Masturbation" in Early Writings, Vol. 1, New York: FSG: 125–132, ISBN 0374513473.
- 1924: "Über Genitalität vom Standpunkt der psychoanalytischen Prognose und Therapie", Internationale Zeitschrift für Psychoanalyse 10. Republished in English in 1975 as "On Genitality: From the Standpoint of Psychoanalytic Prognosis and Therapy" in Early Writings, Vol. 1, New York: FSG: 158–179, ISBN 0374513473.
- 1925: "Weitere Bemerkungen über die therapeutische Bedeutung der Genitallibido", Internationale Zeitschrift für Psychoanalyse 11. Republished in English in 1975 as "Further Remarks on the Therapeutic Significance of Genital Libido" in Early Writings, Vol. 1, New York: FSG: 199–221, ISBN 0374513473.
- 1926: "Über die Quellen der neurotischen Angst (Beitrag zur Theorie der psychoanalytischen Therapie) [On the Sources of Neurotic Anxiety (A Contribution to the Theory of Psychoanalytic Therapy)]", Internationale Zeitschrift für Psychoanalyse 12, and International Journal for Psychoanalysis 7: 381–391.
- 1927: Die Funktion des Orgasmus: Zur Psychopathologie und zur Soziologie des Geschlechtslebens, Vienna: Internationale Psychoanalytische Verlag. Second, revised edition published in English in 1980 as Genitality in the Theory and Therapy of Neurosis, New York: FSG, ISBN 0374516413. Archived

Biology In the following articles Reich explored whether the orgasm theory was rooted in physiology:

- 1934: "Der Orgasmus als Elektro-physiologische Entladung", Zeitschrift für Politische Psychologie und Sexualökonomie 1: 29–43, Copenhagen. Republished in English in 1982 as "The Orgasm as an Electrophysiological Discharge", The Bioelectrical Investigation of Sexuality and Anxiety, New York: FSG: 3–20, ISBN 0374517282.
- 1934: "Der Urgegensatz des Vegetatives Lebens", Zeitschrift für Politische Psychologie und Sexualökonomie 1: 125–142, Copenhagen. Republished in English in 1982 as "Sexuality and Anxiety: The Basic Antithesis of Vegetative Life", The Bioelectrical Investigation of Sexuality and Anxiety, New York: FSG: 21–70, ISBN 0374517282.
- 1937: Experimentelle Ergebnisse über die elektrische Funktion von Sexualitat und Angst, Klinische und Experimentelle Berichte 4, Copenhagen: Sexpol Verlag. Republished in English in 1982 as "The Bioelectrical Function of Sexuality and Anxiety", The Bioelectrical Investigation of Sexuality and Anxiety, New York: FSG: 71–161, ISBN 0374517282.

Synthesis

- 1942: The Discovery of the Orgone Vol. 1: The Function of the Orgasm, New York: Orgone Institute Press.

== See also ==
- Body psychotherapy
- Human sexual response cycle
- Psychosexual development
- Sexual dysfunction
