= Genitality in the Theory and Therapy of Neurosis =

1927 monograph by Wilhelm Reich

- Author: Wilhelm Reich
- Original title: Die Funktion des Orgasmus: Zur Psychopathologie und zur Soziologie des Geschlechtslebens
- Language: German
- Subjects: Neurosis, orgasm, health
- Publisher: Internationaler Psychoanalytischer Verlag
- Publication date: 1927
- Publication place: Vienna
- Media type: Print

Die Funktion des Orgasmus ("The Function of the Orgasm") is a monograph about the ability to achieve orgasm published in 1927 by Wilhelm Reich, later published in English as Genitality in the Theory and Therapy of Neurosis. In it, Reich proposed, based on his therapeutic experience and empirical studies, that orgastic potency should be used as a decisive criterion for mental health.

Neurotic disorder, according to Reich, was always based on a more or less pronounced "orgastic impotence". According to Reich, if a man were permanently unable to experience a "complete orgasm", it would cause a blockage of the libido, which would produce a variety of disorders. Reich saw the treatment goal of psychoanalytic treatment as the restoration of "orgastic potency". To achieve this objective, Reich further developed the psychoanalytic technique: first analysis of resistance, then Character Analysis, and finally, Vegetotherapy.

== Editions ==
"Satisfied genital object love is thus the most powerful opponent of the destructive drive, of pre-genital masochism, of yearning for the womb, and of the punitive superego. This superiority of sexuality over the destructive drive is the objective justification of our therapeutic efforts."

— Wilhelm Reich

After being published in 1927 by the International Psychoanalytic Press, Die Funktion des Orgasmus was never republished or translated until a revised, second edition was published in English in 1980 by Farrar Straus and Giroux. The editors of the second edition changed the title to Genitality in the Theory and Therapy of Neurosis, to avoid confusion with Reich's 1942 The Function of the Orgasm. The latter was a scientific autobiography which included only the detailed description of the orgasm process from the 1927 Die Funktion des Orgasmus.

All other changes to the second edition were made by Reich himself between 1937 and 1945. These changes usually reflected his separation from Sigmund Freud and psychoanalysis. Moreover, the changes indicate that Reich saw his search for understanding genitality as his own commitment to finding the energy source of neurosis, rather than it reflecting Freudian theory or practice. One such change includes reversing the order of the first two chapters, beginning with presenting orgastic potency instead of the Freudian understanding of the neurotic conflict.

== See also ==
- Character Analysis
