= Sexual function =

Sexual health concept

Sexual function is how the body reacts in different stages of the sexual response cycle. It is defined as the ability of an individual to react sexually or to experience sexual pleasure.

== Assessment ==
Relevant aspects of sexual function are described on the basis of a modified version of Masters and Johnson's work. The aspects of sexual function determined as being relevant to the assessment include; sexual desire, erection, orgasm and ejaculation. Guidelines for assessing sexual function are suggested and divided into four stages:

Stage 1 deals with the documentation of the defined aspects of sexual function. The main questions are:

1. Is the function intact? For example: Have there been any occurrences of erections or orgasms during a given period of time?
2. If the function is intact, what is the frequency and/or intensity of the function? For example: How often has the person had an orgasm or erections during the given period of time and how intense is the orgasmic pleasure and erection stiffness compared to youth or the best period in life. The suggested explanations for the absence or waning of functions at this stage are physiological and psychological.

Stage 2 deals with the assessment of the frequency of different sexual activities, such as intercourse, within a given time frame. The possible explanations for an absence or a decreased frequency of sexual activities may include physiological, psychological, social, religious and ethical reasons.

Stage 3 it is estimated if or to what extent waning sexual functions and/or activities cause distress.

Stage 4, the association between the distress due to waning sexual function and well-being and emotional isolation is assessed.

These guidelines were constructed to assess male sexual function in relation with treatment for prostate cancer. However, the concept has been modified and adapted for females.

== See also ==
- Orgastic potency
- Sexual dysfunction
