= Birthgasm =

Orgasm during birth

A birthgasm is a female orgasm that reportedly occurs during childbirth. This is sometimes referred to as an "orgasmic childbirth." Some women use sexual stimulation to ease contractions, instead of anesthesia. Although there is no scientific data available to confirm the existence of this form of orgasm, more than 85% of midwives surveyed by Postel (2013) stated that a sexually pleasurable birth experience was possible, and 69% stated they had observed such a case.
