= Rebecca Chalker =

American author and women's rights activist

Rebecca Chalker (born 1943) is a health writer and women's rights activist who is the author of several books on women's health issues including The Clitoral Truth.

== Early life and education ==
Chalker completed a BA in 1966 and an MA in 1975 from Florida State University in Tallahassee. She served in the Peace Corps from 1966 to 1967 as a teacher in Iran at the Tehran School of Social Work.

Chalker was a vocal critic of United States policy towards Iran, and participated in a delegation to Tehran to December 1979 to investigate deficiencies in U.S. media reporting . She traveled to Tehran as a member of the "Send the Shah Back—Hands Off Iran Delegation" in support of the Iranian Revolution and the occupation of the United States embassy in Iran. After her return to the United States, she and Eileen Schnitger (a fellow member of the Feminist Women's Health Center) disrupted the Women's National Powerlifting Championships while wearing "Send the Shah Back" t-shirts. (Note: The return of the deposed shah, Mohammad Reza Pahlavi, to stand trial in Iran was one of the key demands of the Iranian students who had occupied the embassy and held its staff hostage.)

== Writing career ==
Chalker's books include The Complete Cervical Cap Guide, Overcoming Bladder Disorders, and A Women's Book of Choices: Abortion, Menstrual Extraction, RU-486. She has also written The Clitoral Truth, about women's genital anatomy and ways to enhance sexual responses.

In 1993, Le Anne Schreiber wrote in The New York Times about A Woman's Book of Choices, that "there is one incontrovertible fact of abortion in America: for more than a century, American women's access to safe abortions has been controlled by doctors and legislators. In defiance of that pattern, Rebecca Chalker, an abortion counselor and the author of a number of popular medical books, and Carol Downer, a lawyer and the executive director of the Federation of Feminist Women's Health Centers, have issued a declaration of independence."

Chalker served as Adjunct Professor of Women's and Gender Studies at Pace University in New York City for 18 years and continues to lecture on women's health and sexuality issues.

== Works ==
=== Books ===
- Chalker, Rebecca (1987). The Complete Cervical Cap Guide. Harper & Row.
- Chalker, Rebecca; Whitmore, Kristene E (1991). Overcoming Bladder Disorders: Compassionate, Authoritative Medical and Self-help Solutions for Incontinence, Cystitis, Interstitial Cystitis, Prostate Problems, and Bladder Cancer. Harper Perennial.
- Chalker, Rebecca (2010). The Clitoral Truth: The Secret World at Your Fingertips. Seven Stories Press. (2nd edition published 2018)
- Chalker, Rebecca; Ani, Ekpenyong (2012). Klitoris. Die unbekannte Schöne (in German). Berlin Orlanda.
- Chalker, Rebecca; Downer, Carol (2014). A Woman's Book of Choices. Seven Stories Press.
