= Concerning Specific Forms of Masturbation =

1922 essay by Wilhelm Reich

"Concerning Specific Forms of Masturbation" (originally published as Über Spezifität der Onanieformen) is a 1922 essay by Austrian psychiatrist and psychoanalyst Wilhelm Reich. It was written while he led the Vienna Outpatient Clinic for sexually related problems and is an early work in his career which was to develop around the subject of human sexuality.

In the seven and a half page essay Reich accepts the prevalent notions on the roles of unconscious fantasy and the subsequent emerging guilt feelings which he saw as originating from the act itself. Reich built on papers written by other professionals of his time; however, he decided to probe deeper into the myriad variations of both female and male masturbation.

The essay was presented to the Vienna Psychoanalytic Society on October 10, 1922, and was published in the Internationale Zeitschrift für Psychoanalyse in 1922. It formed the basis for Reich's later views on the role of genitality in the therapy of neuroses.

== The way people masturbate indicative of sexual potency ==
Reich's work with patients at the clinic was often related to problems of diminished sexual potency, or impotence. He therefore decided to look closer at such factors as (1) where do they masturbate? (2) when do they masturbate? (3) with what materials do they masturbate? (4) with what fantasies do they masturbate? (5) how often do they masturbate? (6) in what bodily posture do they masturbate, and is that posture related to any childhood event or events? and (7) with what furniture do they masturbate, and what associations does the act have with that furniture?

From surveying these aspects Reich wanted to separate out healthy forms of masturbation from unhealthy ones.

=== Four categories of male masturbation ===
1. Against the sheet or an improvised vulva (shirt, pillow, etc.), lying face down, and without the assistance of the hands, thrusting the pelvis rhythmically.
2. Using the hands, lying on the side or in a bathtub, by far the most common form.
3. Lying on the back using only the hands.
4. In front of a mirror; while reading rape scenes (a very frequent occurrence, Reich remarked); on the toilet; in public parks (although hidden behind bushes); mutual masturbation with friends etc. .

Only the first of these types indicated a strong inclination towards the opposite sex. The second type shows a strong autoerotic component. The third and fourth types were both considered by Reich to indicate pathological processes. In the third type, he noted that this form was mainly practiced by males with female attitudes, and he gave a poor prognosis for these patients.

== See also ==
- Orgastic potency

== General references ==
- Reich, Wilhelm. Early Writings, 1:125–32. "Über Spezifität der Onanieformen", originally published in Internationale Zeitschrift für Psychoanalyse, vol. 8 (1922). In Corrington, Robert S. Wilhelm Reich: Psychoanalyst and Radical Naturalist, Farrar, Straus and Giroux, NY, 2003, ISBN 0-374-25002-2, pp. 38–40.
