= Geoff Mackley =

New Zealand freelance photographer

- Born: 1963 (age 62–63); Christchurch, New Zealand
- Occupation: Photographer
- Known for: Dangerman
- Notable work: Geoff Mackley: In Extreme Danger
- Website: www.geoffmackley.com

Geoff Mackley is a New Zealand freelance photographer who also specialises in filming breaking news. Known for chasing storms around the world, he was featured in the TV series Dangerman, made for the Discovery Channel.

== Early life ==
Mackley was born in Christchurch, New Zealand, in 1963, to parents Douglas Mackley and Marie Mackley. He was the eldest of three boys, the others being Steve and Richard. His father, Doug, was a keen adventurer, runner, and environmentalist, which inspired Mackley and was one of his "reasons he carried a fascination with the natural world into his teenage years". Mackley was attracted to the natural environment of New Zealand, regularly taking day trips and camping expeditions with his family around the South Island.

In high school, Mackley tended toward subjects like engineering, woodwork, and science. He was inspired by teachers who screened documentaries on volcanoes, hurricanes, and earthquakes - and was heavily involved.

Mackley first began selling action photographs in April 1980 when a local brickworks caught fire. He woke in the early hours of the morning, hopped on his motorbike, and drove to the scene. When he arrived, there was a "fair-sized crowd" but neither the Fire Service nor the media had arrived. He began taking pictures, and later sold them to staff members wanting copies. Understanding that making a living from Photography was "gratifying", Mackley began to invest in "Tait radios" (as used by the Fire Service) to track ongoing Fire Service activity. He later photographed a local suburban fire, and sent the images to The Press. In return, he received $NZ10.

== Career ==
=== 1995–2004: Early work and volcano expeditions ===
Mackley received his first big break in freelance photography when the crater of Mount Ruapehu erupted on 18 September 1995. As soon as he received news of the eruption, he drove four hours from Auckland to Ruapehu, reaching the mountain at 3:00am. By this time, the police had set up an exclusion zone. Avoiding the cordons, Mackley set off at just after 3:30am to make the five-hour climb to the summit, and at around 8:30 he reached Whakapapa Glacier, below the summit ridge. He climbed the summit ridge to the Dome Shelter, an emergency retreat for skiers and climbers, and began filming. Mackley set up a video camera and provided commentary on the eruption. Later that day, he was featured on the TV3 six o'clock news, along with his footage.

Following the filming of Mount Ruapehu's eruption, Mackley was approached by British television production company Granada Studios, who were planning a series of documentaries on volcanic eruptions. He latered gain airtime in these productions, and used his fee to fund further expeditions.

In early 1998, Pioneer Productions reached out to Mackley. They had an idea for a series of documentaries called Volcano Detectives. Discovery Channel screened the series. The series, which began filming in 1998, gave Mackley the opportunity to travel to some of the volcanoes "he'd only read about, or seen on television".

== Personal life ==
Mackley now resides in Christchurch, after having lived in Auckland for several years.

On July 4, 2020, Mackley was the victim of a brutal home invasion at his home in Ellerslie, Auckland, after two masked men jumped his gate. Mackley came out and engaged with the suspects before being knocked unconscious. Footage was captured extensively on CCTV.
