= Jean-Marc Perelmuter =

Canadian astrophysicist and author

- Born: Rio de Janeiro, Brazil
- Citizenship: Canadian
- Education: Beloit College (Undergraduate) Johns Hopkins University (PhD)
- Scientific career
- Fields: Astrophysics, Technology, Entrepreneurship

Jean-Marc Perelmuter is a Canadian astrophysicist, technology entrepreneur, and author.

== Early life and education ==
Perelmuter was born in Rio de Janeiro, Brazil, and later moved to Canada. He completed his undergraduate studies at Beloit College before earning a PhD from Johns Hopkins University. During his graduate studies, he became the first recipient of the Hubble Space Telescope Science Institute's graduate fellowship, where he worked under the mentorship of astronomer Allan Sandage.

== Career ==
=== Astrophysics research ===
Perelmuter collaborated with Sandage on a series of peer-reviewed studies published in The Astrophysical Journal, investigating the expansion of the universe, observational biases, and cosmic evolution. His research also examined the role of galactic mergers in galaxy evolution. In 1993, he identified the progenitor star of supernova SN1993J, contributing to the understanding of supernova chemistry.

Following his academic work, Perelmuter served as a project manager for NASA's science and education initiatives related to the Messenger mission to Mercury. He later taught physics at the University of Victoria.

=== Media and science communication ===
In the 2000s, Perelmuter wrote a weekly astronomy column, Eye on the Sky, for Fox News Online. After the column’s discontinuation, he launched Spacegeek with Doc P, an online video series that used humor and cultural references to make astrophysics accessible.

He was featured in an episode of the Discovery Channel’s Curiosity series titled Alien Invasion: Are We Ready?

=== Entrepreneurship ===
In the late 1990s, Perelmuter founded Artifex Internet Inc., a web hosting and design company with clients including the city of Laval, Quebec, and the Montreal Expos. In 2020, he co-founded Ruume, a browser-based immersive meeting platform offering virtual environments for remote work and collaboration.

== Publications ==
=== Book ===
- Perelmuter, J.-M. (2006). The Sinusoidal Spaghetti.

=== Journal Articles ===
- Sandage, A., & Perelmuter, J.-M. (1990). The surface brightness test for the expansion of the universe. I. Properties of Petrosian metric diameters. The Astrophysical Journal, 350, 481.
- Sandage, A., & Perelmuter, J.-M. (1990). The surface brightness test for the expansion of the universe. II. Radii, surface brightness, and absolute magnitude correlations for nearby E galaxies. The Astrophysical Journal, 361, 1.
- Sandage, A., & Perelmuter, J.-M. (1991). The surface brightness test for the expansion of the universe. III. Reduction of data for the several brightest galaxies in clusters to standard conditions and a first indication that the expansion is real. The Astrophysical Journal, 370, 455.
- Perelmuter, J.-M. (1995). Mergers, accretions, and the globular cluster mean metallicity-number per unit mass relation. The Astrophysical Journal, 454, 762.

=== Report ===
- Andrillat, Y. (1993). Supernova 1993J in NGC 3031 (IAUC No. 5736). International Astronomical Union.
