= Brigador =

2016 video game

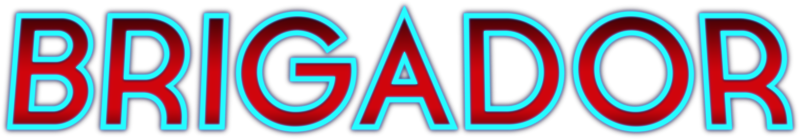

- Box art for video game Brigador: Up Armored Edition
- Developer: Stellar Jockeys
- Publisher: Stellar Jockeys
- Designers: Hugh Monahan; Jack Monahan
- Programmers: Dale Kim; Harry Hsiao; Karl Parakenings
- Artists: Hugh Monahan; Jack Monahan
- Composers: Makeup and Vanity Set
- Platforms: Microsoft Windows, OS X, Linux
- Release: WW: June 2, 2016
- Genre: Real-time tactics
- Mode: Single-player

Brigador (originally titled Matador) is an isometric real-time tactical game from independent studio Stellar Jockeys, released on October 16, 2015 on early access. It officially left early access on June 2, 2016. The game has been compared to the Syndicate and MechWarrior series.

The player is a Brigador (a mercenary-pilot) hired to bring chaos to the city-state Solo Nobre on the colony world Novo Solo after the sudden death of its dictator Great Leader, in order to help an unnamed conglomerate invade the planet and establish control on its population and resources.

Brigador: Up-Armored Edition, was the improved relaunch released on June 2, 2017, which provided a new introduction to game mechanics, rebalanced the game's overall difficulty, added localization support, and made graphical upgrades such as better explosions and lighting changes.

== Gameplay ==
Brigador is divided into two modes: Campaign and Freelance. Each mission in Campaign mode offers the player up to four different loadouts to complete a mission's objectives. The player can choose from three main objectives: eliminate a certain number of enemy NPCs, take out all the marked captains, or destroy the orbital defense platforms before making their escape. Completing a mission successfully rewards the player with money, which they can spend on unlocking in-game flavor text as well as other vehicles, weapons and pilots for use in Freelance mode.

A screenshot of gameplay, depicting a player-controlled Mech firing upon an object. The player's ammunition and health can be seen in the top left corner, as well as their selected driver's portrait.

In Freelance mode, the player chooses a pilot, vehicle, weapons and a "run" of levels to complete. What the player chooses for their run will affect the difficulty of enemies faced, what factions they may encounter, as well as the payout multiplier bonus for successfully completing a run of levels. Additional, harder runs can be purchased using the currency earned within the game.

The enemies are divided in three factions (Loyalists, Corvids, Spacers) who each use distinct vehicles favouring different aspects (armor, speed, shields). Due to being a mercenary the player will fight each faction and can use vehicles and pilots belonging to any of them. Damage done to buildings and civilians in the different urban warfare scenarios is actually encouraged, a small payout being given for any destruction done.

== Development ==
Brigador is the first game by Stellar Jockeys. Co-founders Hugh Monahan and Jack Monahan are behind the game's art direction and design, while Dale Kim and Harry Hsiao worked as programmers on the game's custom engine. The game began development in 2011, and its development was entirely self-funded. Brigador was released in October 2015 as an early access title, with the full launch following in June 2016. Following the 2016 launch, Dale Kim and Harry Hsiao parted amicably from the studio, with Karl Parakenings joining to provide programming support in their stead. On June 2, 2017, the game was relaunched as Brigador: Up-Armored Edition which added more content to the game, rebalanced the game's difficulty, and localized the game into several languages including French, German, Russian, Spanish, Chinese, Japanese, Korean and several others.

== Reception ==
Reception

Aggregate score
Aggregator	Score
Metacritic	70/100

Review scores
Publication	Score
Destructoid	8/10
GameSpot	7/10
PC Gamer (US)	76/100

Brigador: Up-Armored Edition received "mixed or average reviews", according to review aggregator Metacritic. On initial release, the developers found it difficult to generate awareness for the game, which contributed to its commercial failure. However, due to the 2017 relaunch and continued support by the developers, the game saw improved sales numbers, particularly in non-English speaking territories.

In May 2019, a direct sequel to Brigador, titled Brigador Killers, was announced.
