= Vegetotherapy =

Form of psychotherapy

Vegetotherapy is a form of Reichian psychotherapy that involves the physical manifestations of emotions.

== Development ==
The fundamental text of vegetotherapy is Wilhelm Reich's Psychischer Kontakt und vegetative Strömung (1935), later included in the expanded edition of Reich's Character Analysis (1933 and 1949). The practice grew out of Reich's extension of psychoanalysis to cover what he called "character analysis", which involved alleviating a person's body armor and the character defenses that maintain an individual in a state of neurosis.

Reich argued that "the feeling of unity of all body sensations ... increases with each new dissolution of an armor ring," leading ultimately to a merger with the autonomic functions of the body. He considered that "orgone physics reduces the emotional functions of humans even much further, to the forms of movement of molluscs and protozoa". After his claim to have thus discovered "orgone" or life energy, vegetotherapy was accordingly adapted and succeeded by "psychiatric orgone therapy".

Subsequently, neo-Reichian therapists have adopted the body work of vegetotherapy in various forms into their therapeutic practices.

== Practice ==
The practice of vegetotherapy involves the analyst enabling the patient to physically simulate the bodily effects of strong emotions. In this technique, the patient is asked to remove their outer clothing, lie down on a sheet-covered bed in the doctor's office, and breathe deeply and rhythmically.

An additional technique is to palpate or tickle areas of muscular tension, also known as "body armour". This activity and stimulation eventually causes the patient to experience the simulated emotions, thus theoretically releasing emotions pent up inside both the body and the psyche (compare with primal therapy).

Screaming and vomiting may occur as the catharsis of emotive expression breaks down the cathexis of stored emotions. While experiencing a simulated emotional state, the patient may reflect on past experiences that may be the source of their unresolved emotions. These emotions are described as "stored emotions," and in Reichian analysis are seen as manifesting in the body. Vegetotherapy relies on a theory of stored emotions, or affects, where emotions build tensions in the structure of the body. This tension can be seen in shallow or restricted breathing, posture, facial expression, muscular stress (particularly in the circular muscles), and low libido. Good sexual function and unrestricted, natural breathing are seen as evidence of recovery.

Examples of vegetotherapy, as well as interviews with analysts and patients who have undergone vegetotherapy, can be seen in the film Room for Happiness, directed by Dick Young and approved by the American College of Orgonomy.

== Criticism ==
Psychoanalyst Otto Fenichel criticized Reich's relaxation techniques. Although he agreed that there are positive effects of vegetotherapy, he saw two potential problems. First, the possibility of psychological splitting that prevents changes in the body from affecting the mind and second, the need for subsequent working through to integrate the abreacted material into the psyche.

== See also ==
- Alternative medicine
- Body psychotherapy
- Gerda Boyesen
- Neo-Reichian massage
- Primal scream therapy

== Bibliography ==
- Reich, Wilhelm: Psychic Contact and Vegetative Current. (Chap. xiv of Character Analysis, 1949 ff)

Orig. in Reich's Zeitschrift für Politische Psychologie und Sexualökonomie
