= Emmanuele A. Jannini =

Italian sexologist

Angelo Francesco Emmanuele Jannini (born 22 April 1960) is an Italian sex therapist, medical doctor, and academic.

== Biography ==
He was professor of medical sexology at the University of L'Aquila and is full professor of endocrinology and medical sexology at the Faculty of Medicine, Department of Systems Medicine of the University of Rome Tor Vergata . From 2016 to 2018 president of SIAMS (Italian Society of Andrology and Sexual Medicine) as well as the president of the Italian Academy for couple's health. He is also member of Publication Committee of ISSM (International Society for Sexual Medicine). His studies in the male and female sexual and reproductive fields have been published in various international scientific journals ( PNAS, The Journal of Sexual Medicine and PLOS ONE ).

In L'Aquila, he first created the specialist degree course in sexology (Faculty of Psychology) and then, in collaboration with Sapienza University of Rome, the "Clinical Psychosexology" master's degree course. He is visiting professor at the Chinese universities of Shanghai, Guangzhou and Hefei. He leads the column Question of hormones within the Superquark program broadcast on Rai 1 together with Piero Angela.

He is known for his studies on erectile dysfunction and premature ejaculation as well as female anatomy and locating the G-spot (clitorouretrovaginal complex, CUV Complex ). He was a co-author of the 2010 paper "Who's Afraid of the G-spot?. This was a review by six scientists from several countries who looked at the available literature to investigate the phenomena known as the G-Spot. It was published in the Journal of Sexual Medicine which concluded that more research was required.

The International Journal of Impotence Research has included it in a list of 20 authors from around the world with the largest bibliometric index in the andrology field and among the top three in the world for the diagnosis and treatment of premature ejaculation.

== Honors ==
- Officer of Order of Merit of the Italian Republic
- "On the initiative of the President of the Republic" - 2 December 1997
