= Character Analysis =

1933 book by Wilhelm Reich

- The German edition
- Author: Wilhelm Reich
- Original title: Charakteranalyse
- Language: Originally German, translated into English
- Publisher: Farrar, Straus and Giroux
- Publication date: 1933
- Media type: Print
- Pages: 545
- ISBN: 0-374-50980-8

Character Analysis (German: Charakteranalyse) is a 1933 book by Wilhelm Reich.

== Background ==
Reich finished the manuscript in January 1933. He submitted it to the Psychoanalytic Press in Vienna, presided over by Sigmund Freud, who initially accepted it for publication. However, Freud cancelled the contract, wanting to distance himself from Reich's politics. Reich borrowed money and published the book privately in Vienna.

== Summary ==
Reich argues that character structures were organizations of resistance with which individuals avoided facing their neuroses: different character structures — whether schizoid, oral, psychopathic, masochistic, hysterical, compulsive, narcissistic, or rigid — were sustained biologically as body types by unconscious muscular contraction.

== Reception ==
Harry Guntrip wrote that Freud's The Ego and the Id only gained practical importance when Reich's Character Analysis and Anna Freud's The Ego and the Mechanisms of Defence were published, as these books first placed ego-analysis at the centre of psychoanalytic therapy.
