= Wilhelm Reich =

Austrian psychoanalyst (1897–1957)

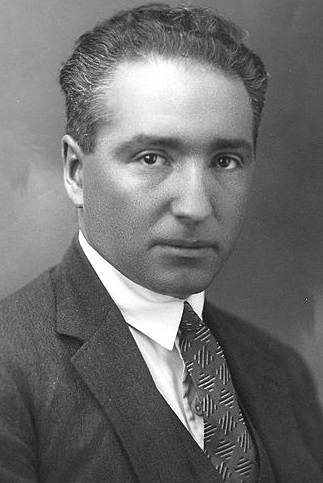
- Portrait by Ludwig Gutmann (Vienna, before 1943)
- Born: 24 March 1897; Dobzau, Kingdom of Galicia and Lodomeria, Austria-Hungary
- Died: 3 November 1957 (aged 60); United States Penitentiary, Lewisburg, Pennsylvania, U.S.
- Resting place: Orgonon, Rangeley, Maine, U.S.
- Education: University of Vienna (MD, 1922)
- Known for: Character analysis; muscular armour; orgastic potency; vegetotherapy; Freudo-Marxism; orgone
- Notable work: The Function of the Orgasm (1927); Character Analysis (1933); The Mass Psychology of Fascism (1933); The Sexual Revolution (1936)
- Spouses: Annie Reich, née Pink (m. 1922–1933); Ilse Ollendorf (m. 1946–1951)
- Partners: Elsa Lindenberg (1932–1939); Aurora Karrer (1955–1957)
- Children: 3, including Eva
- Scientific career
- Fields: Psychoanalysis
- Workplaces: Vienna City Hospital; Vienna Ambulatorium; University of Oslo; The New School
- Academic advisors: Julius Wagner-Jauregg

Wilhelm Reich (/raɪx/; Austrian German: [ˈvɪlhɛlm ˈraɪç]; 24 March 1897 – 3 November 1957) was an Austrian doctor of medicine and a psychoanalyst, a member of the second generation of analysts after Sigmund Freud. The author of several influential books, The Impulsive Character (1925), The Function of the Orgasm (1927), Character Analysis (1933), and The Mass Psychology of Fascism (1933), he became one of the most radical figures in the history of psychiatry. (Note: Elisabeth Young-Bruehl (2008): "Reich, a year and a half younger than Anna Freud, was the youngest instructor at the Training Institute, where his classes on psychoanalytic technique, later presented in a book called Character Analysis, were crucial to his whole group of contemporaries." Richard Sterba (psychoanalyst), 1982: "This book [Character Analysis] serves even today as an excellent introduction to psychoanalytic technique. In my opinion, Reich's understanding of and technical approach to resistance prepared the way for Anna Freud's Ego and the Mechanisms of Defence (1936)." Harry Guntrip, 1961: " ... the two important books of the middle 1930s, Character Analysis (1935) by Wilhelm Reich and The Ego and the Mechanisms of Defence (1936) by Anna Freud.")

Reich's work on character contributed to the development of Anna Freud's The Ego and the Mechanisms of Defence (1936), and his idea of muscular armour—the expression of the personality in the way the body moves—shaped innovations such as body psychotherapy, Gestalt therapy, bioenergetic analysis and primal therapy. His writing influenced generations of intellectuals; he coined the phrase "the sexual revolution" and according to one historian acted as its midwife. During the 1968 student uprisings in Paris and Berlin, students scrawled his name on walls and threw copies of The Mass Psychology of Fascism at police.

After graduating in medicine from the public University of Vienna in 1922, Reich became deputy director of Freud's outpatient clinic, the Vienna Ambulatorium. During the 1930s, he was part of a general trend among younger analysts and Frankfurt sociologists that tried to reconcile psychoanalysis with Marxism. He established the first sexual advisory clinics in Vienna, along with Marie Frischauf. He said he wanted to "attack the neurosis by its prevention rather than treatment".

Reich moved to Oslo, Norway in 1934. He then moved on to New York in 1939, after having accepted a position as Assistant Professor at the New School for Social Research. During his five years in Oslo, he had coined the term "orgone energy"—from "orgasm" and "organism"—for the notion of life energy. In 1940 he started building orgone accumulators, modified Faraday cages that he claimed were beneficial for cancer patients. He claimed that his laboratory cancer mice had had remarkable positive effects from being kept in a Faraday cage, so he built human-size versions, where one could sit inside. This led to newspaper stories about "sex boxes" that cured cancer.

Following two critical articles about him in The New Republic and Harper's in 1947, the U.S. Food and Drug Administration obtained an injunction against the interstate shipment of orgone accumulators and associated literature, calling them "fraud of the first magnitude". Charged with contempt in 1956 for having violated the injunction, Reich was sentenced to two years imprisonment, and that summer over six tons of his publications were destroyed by order of the court. (Note: Encyclopædia Britannica, 2015: "From 1956 to 1960 many of his writings and his equipment were seized and destroyed by FDA officials. In the 21st century some considered this wholesale destruction to be one of the most blatant examples of censorship in U.S. history." James Strick (historian of science), 2015: "In 1956 and again in 1960, officers of the U.S. government supervised the public burning of the books and scientific instruments of Austrian-born scientist Wilhelm Reich. This was one of the most heinous acts of censorship in U.S. history, as New York publisher Roger Straus was heard to remark many times over decades afterward, explaining why his firm, Farrar, Straus, and Giroux, steadfastly brought all of Reich's published works back into print beginning in 1960.") He died in prison of heart failure just over a year later.

== Early life ==
=== Childhood ===
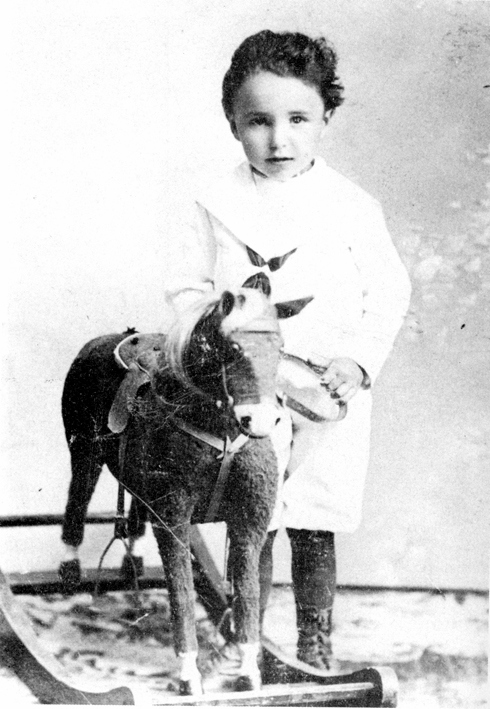
Reich in 1900

Reich was born on 24 March 1897, the first of two sons to Leon Reich, a farmer, and his wife Cäcilie (née Roniger) in Dobzau, Galicia, then part of Austria-Hungary, now in Ukraine, into a Jewish family. Wilhelm Reich's parents were married by Rabbi Schmelkes on June 4, 1895. Wilhelm was circumcised four days after his birth. He had a sister, born one year after Reich, but she died in infancy. Shortly after his birth, the family moved to Jujinetz, a village in Bukovina, where his father ran a cattle farm leased by his mother's uncle, Josef Blum.

=== Death of parents ===
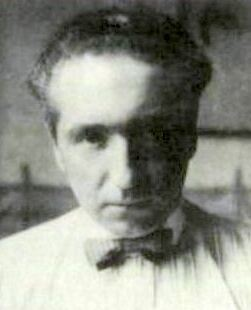
Reich in his mid twenties

Reich was taught at home until he was 12, when his mother was discovered having an affair with his live-in tutor. Reich wrote about the affair in 1920 in his first published paper, "Über einen Fall von Durchbruch der Inzestschranke" (German: "About a Case of Breaching the Incest Taboo"), presented in the third person as though about a patient. He wrote that he would follow his mother when she went to the tutor's bedroom at night, feeling ashamed and jealous, and wondering if they would kill him if they found out that he knew. He briefly thought of forcing her to have sex with him on the threat of telling his father. In the end, he did tell his father, and after a protracted period of beatings, his mother committed suicide on October 1, 1910, for which Reich blamed himself.

With the tutor ordered out of the house, Reich was sent to an all-male gymnasium in Czernowitz. It was during this period that a skin condition appeared, diagnosed as psoriasis, that plagued him for the rest of his life, leading several commentators to remark on his ruddy complexion. His father died of tuberculosis on May 3, 1914, and because of rampant inflation the father's insurance was worthless, so no money was forthcoming for the brothers. Reich managed the farm and continued with his studies, graduating in 1915 with Stimmeneinhelligkeit (German: "unanimous approval"). The Russians invaded Bukovina that summer and the Reich brothers fled, losing everything. Reich wrote in his diary: "I never saw either my homeland or my possessions again. Of a well-to-do past, nothing was left."

== 1919–1930: Vienna ==
=== Undergraduate studies ===
Reich joined the Austro-Hungarian Army during the First World War, serving from 1915 to 1918, for the last two years as a lieutenant at the Italian front with 40 men under his command. When the war ended he headed for Vienna, enrolling in law at the University of Vienna, but found it dull and switched to medicine after the first semester. He arrived with nothing in a city with little to offer; the overthrow of the Austria-Hungarian empire a few weeks earlier had left the newly formed Republic of German-Austria in the grip of famine. Reich lived on soup, oats and dried fruit from the university canteen, and shared an unheated room with his brother and another undergraduate, wearing his coat and gloves indoors to stave off the cold. He fell in love with another medical student, Lia Laszky, with whom he was dissecting a corpse, but it was largely unrequited.

Myron Sharaf, his biographer, wrote that Reich loved medicine but was caught between a reductionist/mechanistic and vitalist view of the world. Reich wrote later of this period:

The question, "What is Life?" lay behind everything I learned. ... It became clear that the mechanistic concept of life, which dominated our study of medicine at the time, was unsatisfactory ... There was no denying the principle of creative power governing life; only it was not satisfactory as long as it was not tangible, as long as it could not be described or practically handled. For, rightly, this was considered the supreme goal of natural science.

=== Introduction to Freud ===
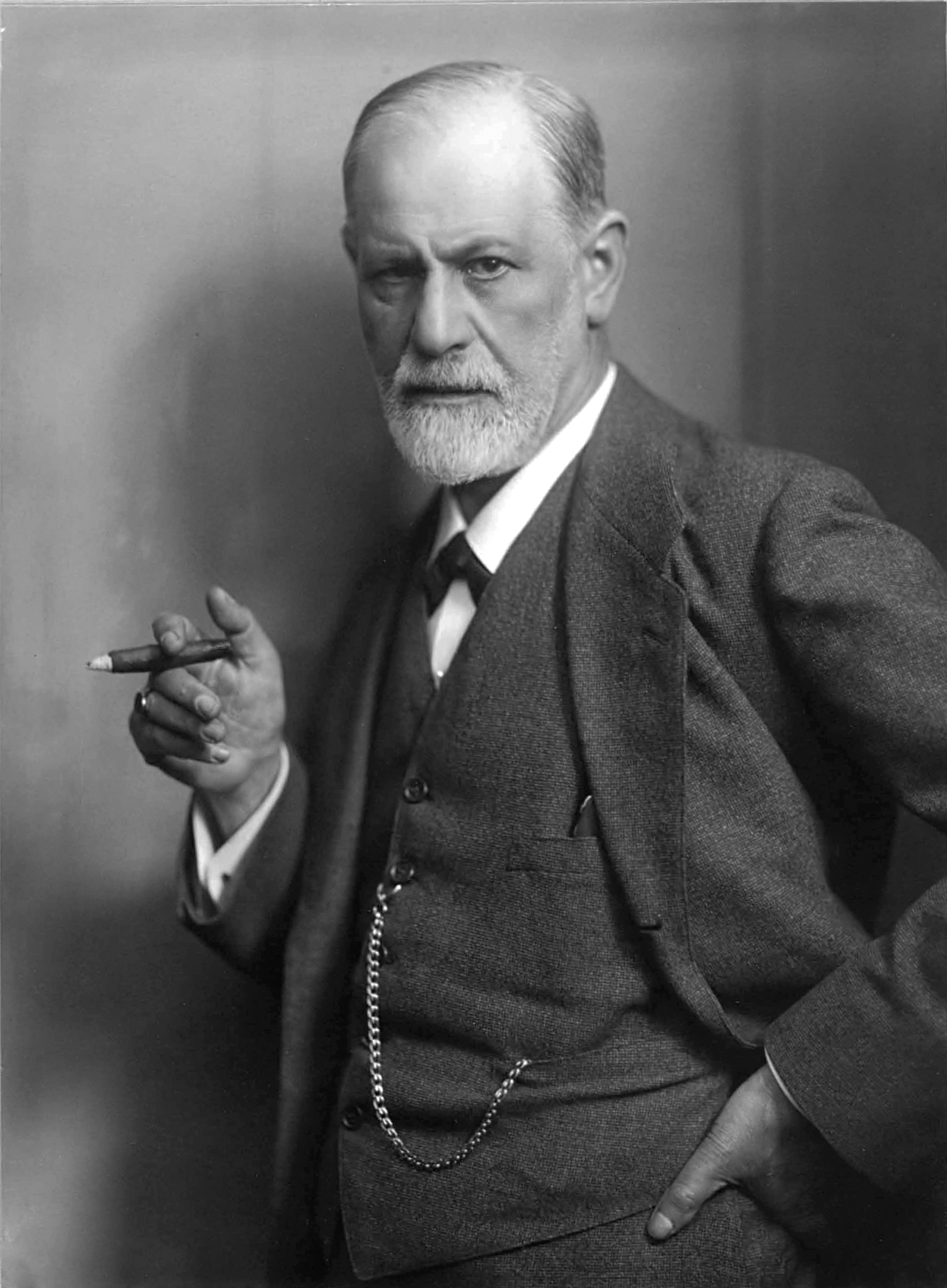
Sigmund Freud

Reich first met Sigmund Freud in 1919, when he asked Freud for a reading list for a seminar concerning sexology. It seems they left a strong impression on each other. Freud allowed him to start meeting with analytic patients in September that year, although Reich was just 22 years old and still an undergraduate, which gave him a small income. He was accepted as a guest member of the Vienna Psychoanalytic Association, becoming a regular member in October 1920, and began his own analysis with Isidor Sadger. He lived and worked out of an apartment on Berggasse 7, the street on which Freud lived at no. 19, in the Alsergrund area of Vienna.

One of Reich's first patients was Lore Kahn, a 19-year-old young woman with whom he had an affair. Freud had warned analysts not to involve themselves with their patients, but in the early days of psychoanalysis the warnings went unheeded. According to Reich's diaries, Kahn became ill in November 1920 and died of sepsis after sleeping in a bitterly cold room she had rented as a place for her and Reich to meet secretly, since his landlady, and her parents, had forbidden them to meet.

=== First marriage, graduation ===
Two months after Kahn's death, Reich accepted her friend, Annie Pink (1902–1971), as an analysand. Pink was Reich's fourth female patient, a medical student three months shy of her 19th birthday. He had an affair with her too, and married her in March 1922 at her father's insistence, with psychoanalysts Otto Fenichel and Edith Buxbaum as witnesses. Annie Reich became a well-known psychoanalyst herself. The marriage produced two daughters, Eva (1924–2008) and Lore (1928–2024), both of whom became physicians; Lore Reich Rubin also became a psychiatrist and psychoanalyst.

Because he was a war veteran, Reich was allowed to complete a combined bachelor's and M.D. in four years, instead of six, and graduated in July 1922. After graduating, he worked in internal medicine at the city's University Hospital, and studied neuropsychiatry from 1922 to 1924 at the hospital's neurological and psychiatric clinic under Professor Julius Wagner von Jauregg, who won the Nobel Prize in Medicine in 1927.

=== Vienna Ambulatorium ===
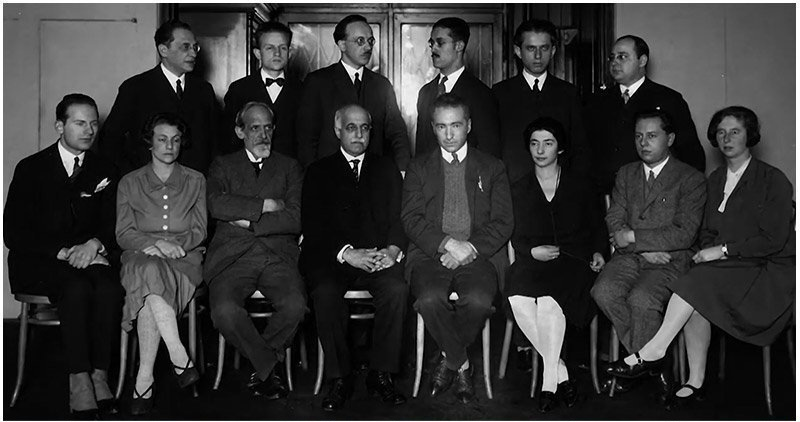
Staff of the Vienna Ambulatorium, 1922. Eduard Hitschmann is seated fourth from the left, Reich fifth, and Annie Reich first on the right.

In 1922, Reich began working in Freud's psychoanalytic outpatient clinic, known as the Vienna Ambulatorium, which was opened on May 22 that year at Pelikangasse 18 by Eduard Hitschmann. Reich became the assistant director under Hitschmann in 1924 and worked there until his move to Berlin in 1930.

Between 1922 and 1932, the clinic offered free or reduced-cost psychoanalysis to 1,445 men and 800 women, many suffering from shell shock after World War I. It was the second such clinic to open under Freud's direction; the first was the Poliklinik in Berlin, set up in 1920 by Max Eitingon and Ernst Simmel.

Sharaf writes that working with labourers, farmers and students allowed Reich to move away from treating neurotic symptoms to observing chaotic lifestyles and anti-social personalities. Reich argued that neurotic symptoms such as obsessive–compulsive disorder were an unconscious attempt to gain control of a hostile environment, including poverty or childhood abuse. They were examples of what he called "character armour" (Charakterpanzer), repetitive patterns of behaviour, speech and body posture that served as defence mechanisms. According to Danto, Reich sought out patients at the Ambulatorium who had been diagnosed as psychopaths, believing that psychoanalysis could free them of their rage.

Reich joined the faculty of the Psychoanalytic Institute in Vienna in 1924 and became its director of training. According to Danto, he was well-regarded for the weekly technical seminars he chaired at the Ambulatorium, where he gave papers on his theory of character structure, arguing that psychoanalysis should be based on the examination of unconscious character traits, later known as ego defences. The seminars were attended, from 1927, by Fritz Perls, who went on to develop Gestalt therapy with his wife, Laura Perls. Several commentators remarked on how captivating the seminars were and how eloquently Reich spoke. According to a Danish newspaper in 1934:

The moment he starts to speak, not at the lectern, but walking around it on cat's paws, he is simply enchanting. In the Middle Ages, this man would have been sent into exile. He is not only eloquent, he also keeps his listeners spellbound by his sparking personality.

=== Der triebhafte Charakter ===
Reich's first book, Der triebhafte Charakter: eine psychoanalytische Studie zur Pathologie des Ich ("The Impulsive Character: A Psychoanalytic Study of the Pathology of the Self"), was published in 1925. It was a study of the anti-social personalities he had encountered in the Ambulatorium, and argued the need for a systematic theory of character. The book won him professional recognition, including from Freud, who in 1927 arranged for his appointment to the executive committee of the Vienna Psychoanalytic Society. The appointment was made over the objection of Paul Federn, who had been Reich's second analyst in 1922 and who, according to Sharaf, regarded Reich as a psychopath. (Note: Myron Sharaf, 1994: Sharaf writes about Sandor Rado's diagnosis of an "insidious psychotic process" that Reich's personality and views were seen as "dangerous", that Federn regarded Reich as a "psychopath", and that Annie Reich and Otto Fenichel concurred. Christopher Turner, 2011: "Paul Federn, who had lobbied to exclude Reich from the executive committee since the late twenties, now went so far as to label him a psychopath who slept with all his female patients. 'Either Reich goes or I go,' he said. [Sandor] Rado, who in 1930 had described Reich as suffering from a 'mild paranoid tendency', now claimed to have observed signs of an 'insidious psychotic process' at that time, and Federn also later maintained he had detected 'incipient schizophrenia' during his analysis of Reich.") Reich found the society dull and wrote that he behaved "like a shark in a pond of carps".

=== Orgastic potency ===
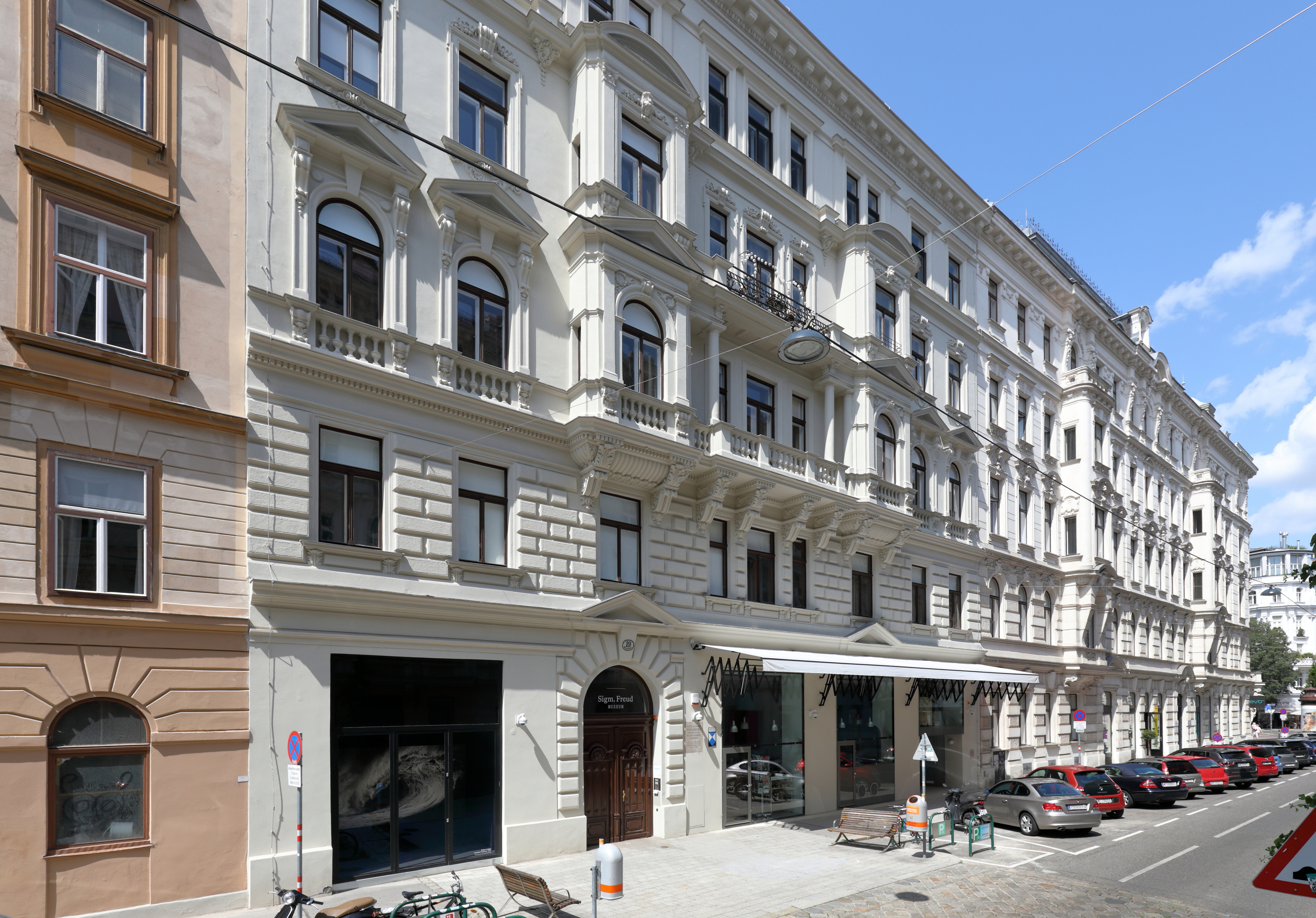
Reich lived for a time on Berggasse in Vienna (seen here in 2021), where Freud lived at number 19

Beginning in 1924, Reich published a series of papers on the idea of "orgastic potency", the ability to release the emotions from the muscles and lose the self in an uninhibited orgasm, an idea that Freud came to call Reich's "Steckenpferd" (hobby horse). Reich argued that psychic health and the ability to love depended on orgastic potency, the full discharge of the libido: "Sexual release in the sex act must correspond to the excitement which leads up to it." He wrote: "It is not just to fuck ... not the embrace in itself, not the intercourse. It is the real emotional experience of the loss of your ego, of your whole spiritual self." He argued that orgastic potency was the goal of character analysis.

Whereas Reich's work on character was well received by the psychoanalytic community, Sharaf writes, his work on orgastic potency was unpopular from the start and later ridiculed or criticized. He came to be known as the "prophet of the better orgasm" and the "founder of a genital utopia", sharply characterized by Andreas Dorschel as "a source of sexual misery": "Whenever women did not reach orgasm, Reich's orgasmocracy branded them as immature, neurotic or lifeless."

=== Rest cure in Switzerland ===
Reich's brother died of tuberculosis (TB) in 1926, which had also killed their father. Christopher Turner writes in his biography of Reich that a quarter of deaths in Vienna were caused by TB in the 1920s. Reich himself contracted it in 1927 and spent several weeks in the winter of that year in a sanitorium in Davos, Switzerland, where TB patients went for rest cures and fresh air before antibiotics became widely available around 1945. Turner writes that Reich underwent a political and existential crisis in Davos; he returned home in the spring angry and paranoid, according to Annie Reich. Some months later he and Annie were on the streets during the July Revolt of 1927 in Vienna, when 84 workers were shot and killed by police and another 600 were injured. It seems that the experience changed Reich; he wrote that it was his first encounter with human irrationality. He began to doubt everything, and in 1928 joined the Communist Party of Austria:

As if struck by a blow, one suddenly recognizes the scientific futility, the biological senselessness, and the social noxiousness of views and institutions, which until that moment had seemed altogether natural and self-evident. It is a kind of eschatological experience so frequently encountered in a pathological form in schizophrenics. I might even voice the belief that the schizophrenic form of psychic illness is regularly accompanied by illuminating insight into the irrationalism of social and political mores.

=== Sex-pol movement ===
Partly in response to the shooting he had witnessed in Vienna, Reich, then 30, opened six free sex-counseling clinics in the city in 1927 for working-class patients. Each clinic was overseen by a physician, with three obstetricians and a lawyer on call, and offered what Reich called Sex-Pol counseling. Sex-Pol stood for the German Society of Proletarian Sexual Politics. Reich offered a mixture of "psychoanalytic counseling, Marxist advice and contraceptives", Danto writes, and argued for a sexual permissiveness, including for young people and the unmarried, that unsettled other psychoanalysts and the political left. The clinics were immediately overcrowded by people seeking help.

He also took to the streets in a mobile clinic, driving to parks and out to the suburbs with other psychoanalysts and physicians. Reich would talk to the teenagers and men, while a gynaecologist fitted the women with contraceptive devices, and Lia Laszky, the woman Reich fell in love with at medical school, spoke to the children. They also distributed sex-education pamphlets door to door.

=== Die Funktion des Orgasmus ===
Reich published Die Funktion des Orgasmus ("The Function of the Orgasm") in 1927, dedicating it to Freud. He had presented a copy of the manuscript to Freud on the latter's 70th birthday on 6 May 1926. Freud had not appeared impressed. He replied, "That thick?" when Reich handed it to him, and took two months to write a brief but positive letter in response, which Reich interpreted as a rejection. (Note: Freud's letter read: "Dear Dr. Reich, I took plenty of time, but finally I did read the manuscript which you dedicated to me for my anniversary. I find the book valuable, rich in observation and thought. As you know, I am in no way opposed to your attempt to solve the problem of neurasthenia by explaining it on the basis of the absence of genital primacy.") Freud's view was that the matter was more complicated than Reich suggested, and that there was no single cause of neurosis. He wrote in 1928 to another psychoanalyst, Dr. Lou Andreas-Salomé:

We have here a Dr. Reich, a worthy but impetuous young man, passionately devoted to his hobby-horse, who now salutes in the genital orgasm the antidote to every neurosis. Perhaps he might learn from your analysis of K. to feel some respect for the complicated nature of the psyche.

=== Visit to the Soviet Union ===
In 1929, Reich and his wife visited the Soviet Union on a lecture tour, leaving the two children in the care of the psychoanalyst Berta Bornstein. Sharaf writes that he returned even more convinced of the link between sexual and economic oppression, and of the need to integrate Marx and Freud. In 1929 his article "Dialectical Materialism and Psychoanalysis" was published in Unter dem Banner des Marxismus, the German Communist Party journal. The article explored whether psychoanalysis was compatible with historical materialism, class struggle and proletarian revolution. Reich concluded that they were compatible if dialectical materialism was applied to psychology. This was one of the central theoretical statements of his Marxist period, which included The Imposition of Sexual Morality (1932), The Sexual Struggle of Youth (1932), The Mass Psychology of Fascism (1933), "What is Class Consciousness?" (1934) and The Sexual Revolution (1936).

== 1930–1934: Germany, Denmark, Sweden ==
=== Verlag für Sexualpolitik ===
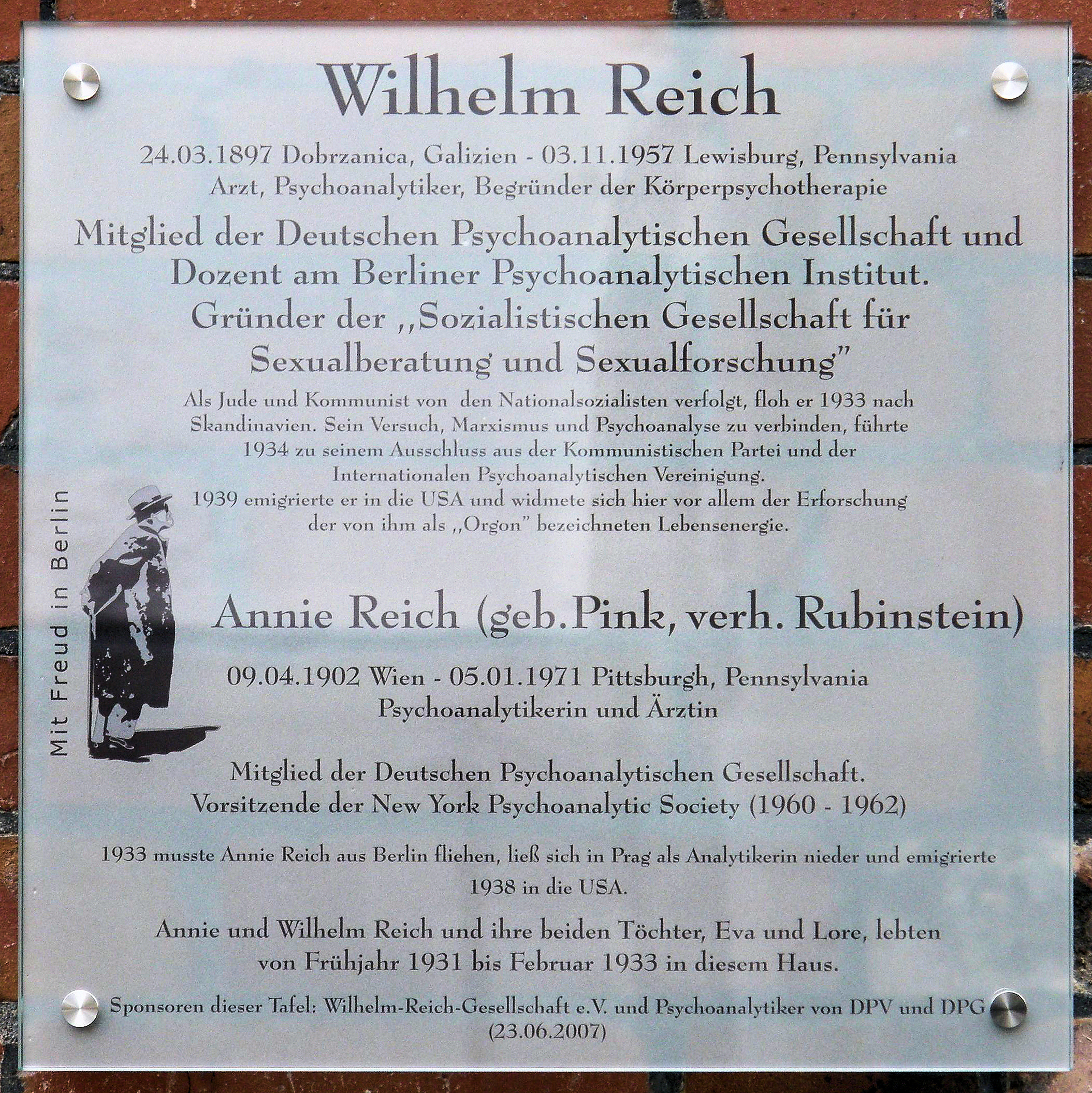
Plaque on Schlangenbader Straße 87, Berlin-Wilmersdorf, the house in which Reich lived, 1931–1933.

Reich and his wife moved to Berlin in November 1930, where he set up clinics in working-class areas, taught sex education and published pamphlets. He joined the Communist Party of Germany, but grew impatient over their delay in publishing one of his pamphlets, Der sexuelle Kampf der Jugend (1932) – later published in English as The Sexual Struggle of Youth (1972) – and so set up his own publishing house, Verlag für Sexualpolitik, to produce the pamphlet himself.

His subsequent involvement in a conference promoting adolescent sexuality caused the party to announce that it would no longer publish his material. On 24 March 1933 Freud told him that his contract with the International Psychoanalytic Publishers to publish Character Analysis had been cancelled. Sharaf writes that this was almost certainly because of Reich's stance on teenage sex.

=== Character Analysis ===
Reich published what Robert Corrington called his masterpiece, Charakteranalyse: Technik und Grundlagen für studierende und praktizierende Analytiker, in 1933. It was revised and published in English in 1946 and 1949 as Character Analysis. The book sought to move psychoanalysis toward a reconfiguration of character structure.

For Reich, character structure was the result of social processes, in particular a reflection of castration and Oedipal anxieties playing themselves out within the nuclear family. Les Greenberg and Jeremy Safran write that Reich proposed a functional identity between the character, emotional blocks, and tension in the body, or what he called character (or muscular/body) armour (Charakterpanzer).

Reich proposed that muscular armour was a defence that contained the history of the patient's traumas. For example, he blamed Freud's jaw cancer on his muscular armour, rather than his smoking: Freud's Judaism meant he was "biting down" impulses, rather than expressing them. Dissolving the armour would bring back the memory of the childhood repression that had caused the blockage in the first place.

=== End of first marriage ===
Reich had several affairs during his marriage to Annie Reich, which ended in 1933 after he began a serious relationship in May 1932 with Elsa Lindenberg, a dancer and pupil of Elsa Gindler. He was living with Lindenberg in Germany when Hitler became Chancellor in January 1933. On March 2 that year, the Nazi newspaper Völkischer Beobachter published an attack on Der Sexuelle Kampf der Jugend. Reich and Lindenberg left for Vienna the next day. They moved from there to Denmark, where Reich was excluded from the Danish Communist Party in November 1933 (without ever having joined it) because of his promotion of teenage sex and the publication that year of The Mass Psychology of Fascism, which they regarded as "counterrevolutionary". There were multiple complaints about his promotion of abortion, sex education, and the attempted suicide of a teenage patient. According to Turner, when Reich's visa expired, it was not renewed.

He tried to find support among psychoanalysts in the UK so that he could settle there, and was interviewed in London by Ernest Jones, Melanie Klein, Joan Riviere and James Strachey. They decided that he had been "insufficiently analysed" and had an unresolved hostility toward Freud. Anna Freud, Freud's daughter—whom Jones had contacted about Reich's desire to relocate to England—wrote in 1938: "There is a wall somewhere where he stops to understand the other person's point of view and flies off into a world of his own ... He is an unhappy person ... and I am afraid this will end in sickness."

Reich and Lindenberg moved instead to Malmö in Sweden, which Reich described as "better than a concentration camp", but he was placed under surveillance when police suspected that the hourly visits of patients to his hotel room meant he was running a brothel, with Lindenberg as the prostitute. The government declined to extend his visa, and the couple had to move briefly back to Denmark, Reich under an assumed name.

=== Vegetotherapy ===
From 1930 onwards, Reich began to treat patients outside the limits of psychoanalysis's restrictions. He would sit opposite them, rather than behind them as they lay on a couch (the traditional psychoanalyst's position), and begin talking to them and answering their questions, instead of offering the stock, "Why do you ask?" analyst's response. He had noticed that after a successful course of psychoanalysis his patients would hold their bodies differently, so he began to try to communicate with the body using touch. He asked his male patients to undress down to their shorts, and sometimes entirely, and his female patients down to their underclothes, and began to massage them to loosen their body armour. He would also ask them to simulate physically the effects of certain emotions in the hope of triggering them.

He first presented the principles of what he called character-analytic vegetotherapy in August 1934, in a paper entitled "Psychischer Kontakt und vegetative Strömung" ("Psychological Contact and Vegetative Current") at the 13th International Congress of Psychoanalysis at Lucerne, Switzerland. His second wife, Ilse Ollendorf, said vegetotherapy replaced the psychoanalytic method of never touching a patient with "a physical attack by the therapist".

The method eliminated the psychoanalytic doctrine of neutrality. Reich argued that the psychoanalytic taboos reinforced the neurotic taboos of the patient, and that he wanted his patients to see him as human. He would press his thumb or the palm of his hand hard (and painfully) on their jaws, necks, chests, backs, or thighs, aiming to dissolve their muscular, and thereby characterological, rigidity. He wrote that the purpose of the massage was to retrieve the repressed memory of the childhood situation that had caused the repression. If the session worked, he would see waves of pleasure move through their bodies, which he called the "orgasm reflex". According to Sharaf, the twin goals of Reichian therapy were the attainment of this orgasm reflex during sessions and orgastic potency during intercourse. Reich briefly considered calling it "orgasmotherapy", but thought better of it.

Just before the crucial August 1934 Lucerne conference (13th International Congress of Psycho-analysis), Reich was (perhaps naively) ignorant of the ground-swell of opinion against him. At the meeting, he was asked to resign from the International Psychoanalytical Association, where Anna Freud was the "acknowledged leader" at the time, for prioritizing his revolutionary political-social (communist) views over Freud's psychoanalytic ideas. Besides the theoretical differences, there was also, by that time, a significant level of "appeasement" to the increasing power of Nazism. Reich had protested to Anna Freud (Secretary of the International Association) about the omission of his name from the list of German members of the Association, apparently on the spurious grounds that he was going to join the Scandinavian branch. Ernest Jones was the President of the International Association and he had also turned against Reich, combined with Paul Federn and Max Eitingon, who had all levelled personal attacks against Reich.

According to Lore Reich Rubin, Reich's daughter, Anna Freud was responsible for destroying her father's career: "She got rid of him". However, there is also some evidence that she later regretted this. He arrived at the conference, relatively unconscious about his future treatment. He presented a significant paper and was then informed that he was to be excluded. Turner writes that he cemented his reputation as a madman, camping in a tent outside the conference hall and reportedly carrying a large knife in his belt. According to the psychiatrist Grete L. Bibring, Paul Federn declared, "Either Reich goes or I go."

== 1934–1939: Norway ==
=== Bioelectricity ===
In October 1934, Reich and Lindenberg moved to Oslo, Norway, where Harald K. Schjelderup, professor of psychology at the University of Oslo, had invited Reich to lecture on character analysis and vegetotherapy. They ended up staying for five years. During his time in Norway, Reich attempted to ground his orgasm theory in biology, exploring whether Freud's metaphor of the libido was in fact electricity or a chemical substance, an argument Freud had proposed in the 1890s but had abandoned. Reich argued that conceiving of the orgasm as nothing but mechanical tension and relaxation could not explain why some experience pleasure and others do not. He wanted to know what additional element had to be present for pleasure to be felt.

Reich was influenced by the work of the Austrian internist Friedrich Kraus, who argued in his paper Allgemeine und Spezielle Pathologie der Person (1926) that the biosystem was a relay-like switch mechanism of electrical charge and discharge. Reich wrote in an essay, "Der Orgasmus als Elektro-physiologische Entladung" ("The Orgasm as an Electrophysiological Discharge", 1934), that the orgasm is just such a bioelectrical discharge and proposed his "orgasm formula": mechanical tension (filling of the organs with fluid; tumescence) → bioelectrical charge → bioelectrical discharge → mechanical relaxation (detumescence).

In 1935, Reich bought an oscillograph and attached it to friends and students, who volunteered to touch and kiss each other while Reich read the tracings. One of the volunteers was Willy Brandt, the future chancellor of Germany. At the time, he was married to Reich's secretary, Gertrude Gaasland, and was living in Norway to organize protests against Nazi Germany. Reich also took measurements from the patients of a psychiatric hospital near Oslo, including catatonic patients, with the permission of the hospital's director. Reich described the oscillograph experiments in 1937 in Experimentelle Ergebnisse über die elektrische Funktion von Sexualität und Angst (The Bioelectrical Investigation of Sexuality and Anxiety).

=== Bion experiments ===
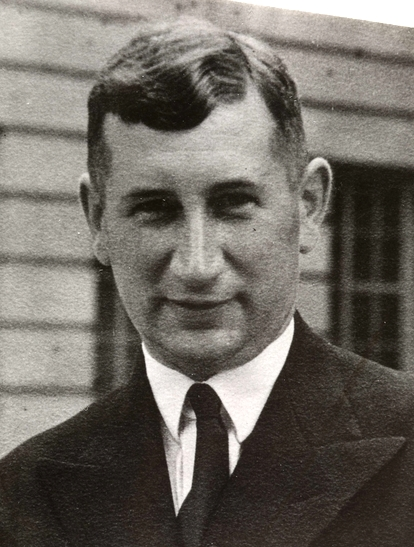
Cancer specialist Leiv Kreyberg dismissed Reich's work.

From 1934 to 1939, Reich conducted what he called the bion experiments, which he published as Die Bione: zur Entstehung des vegetativen Lebens in Oslo in February 1938 (published in English in 1979 and later called The Bion Experiments on the Origin of Life). He examined protozoa and grew cultured vesicles using grass, sand, iron and animal tissue, boiling them and adding potassium and gelatin. Having heated the materials to incandescence with a heat-torch, he wrote that he had seen bright, glowing, blue vesicles. His photographs and films of his experiments were taken by Kari Berggrav. He called them "bions" and believed they were a rudimentary form of life, halfway between life and non-life. He wrote that when he poured the cooled mixture onto growth media, bacteria were born, dismissing the idea that the bacteria were already present in the air or on other materials.

In what Sharaf writes was the origins of the orgone theory, Reich said he could see two kinds of bions, the blue vesicles and smaller red ones shaped like lancets. He called the former PA-bions and the latter T-bacilli, the T standing for Tod, German for death. He wrote in his book The Cancer Biopathy (1948) that he had found T-bacilli in rotting cancerous tissue obtained from a local hospital, and when injected into mice they caused inflammation and cancer. He concluded that, when orgone energy diminishes in cells through aging or injury, the cells undergo "bionous degeneration". At some point the deadly T-bacilli start to form in the cells. Death from cancer, he believed, was caused by an overwhelming growth of the T-bacilli.

=== Opposition to his ideas ===
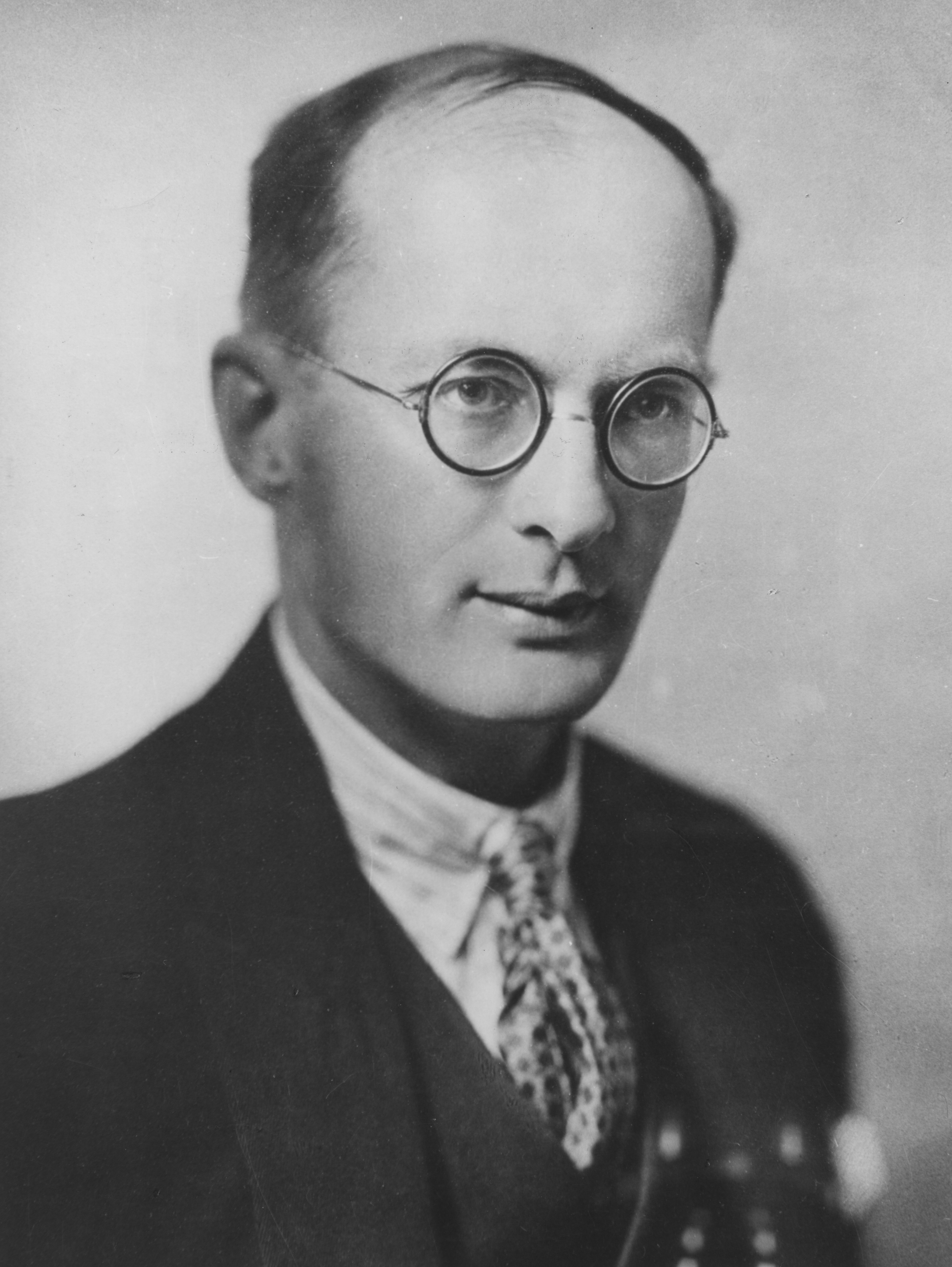
Bronisław Malinowski wrote to newspapers in Norway in support of Reich.

In 1937, Reich faced strong opposition from Norwegian scientists regarding his theories on bions, many deriding them as nonsense. To counter this, he allowed the Norwegian pathologist Leiv Kreyberg to examine one of his bion preparations under a microscope. Kreyberg wrote that, while the broth Reich had used as his culture medium was indeed sterile, the bacteria were ordinary staphylococci, and thus concluded that Reich's control measures to prevent infection from airborne bacteria were not as foolproof as Reich believed. Kreyberg accused Reich of being ignorant of basic bacteriological and anatomical facts, while Reich accused Kreyberg of having failed to recognize living cancer cells under magnification. Reich sent a sample of the bacteria to a Norwegian biologist, Theodor Thjøtta of the Oslo Bacteriological Institute, who also blamed airborne infection. As a result, Tidens Tegn, a leading liberal newspaper, launched a campaign against him with support from scientists and other newspapers.

By February 1938, Reich's visa had expired. Several Norwegian scientists argued against an extension, Kreyberg saying, "If it is a question of handing Dr. Reich over to the Gestapo, then I will fight that, but if one could get rid of him in a decent manner, that would be the best." The writer Sigurd Hoel asked: "When did it become a reason for deportation that one looked in a microscope when one was not a trained biologist?" Reich received support from overseas, first from the anthropologist Bronisław Malinowski, who in March wrote to the press in Norway that Reich's sociological works were "a distinct and valuable contribution toward science", and from A. S. Neill, founder of Summerhill, a progressive school in England, who argued that "the campaign against Reich seems largely ignorant and uncivilized, more like fascism than democracy". Norway was proud of its intellectual tolerance, so the "Reich affair", especially following the country's 1936 expulsion of Leon Trotsky, put Nygaardsvold's government on the spot. A compromise was found in which Reich was given his visa, but a royal decree was later issued stipulating that anyone wanting to practice psychoanalysis needed a licence, which Reich was not permitted to have.

The affair drew much attention between March and December 1938, with more than 165 articles and letters appearing in 13 Norwegian newspapers denouncing Reich's work. The most prominent was published by the country's largest newspaper, Aftenposten, on 19 and 21 April 1938, containing the views of both Kreyberg and Thjøtta, in which the former alleged that "Mr. Reich" knew less about bacteria and anatomy than a first-year medical student. When Reich requested a detailed control study, Kreyberg responded that his work did not merit it. Throughout the affair Reich issued just one public statement, when he asked for a commission to replicate his bion experiments. Sharaf writes that the opposition to his work affected his personality and relationships. He was left humiliated, no longer comfortable in public, and seething with bitterness against the researchers who had denounced him.

=== Personal life ===
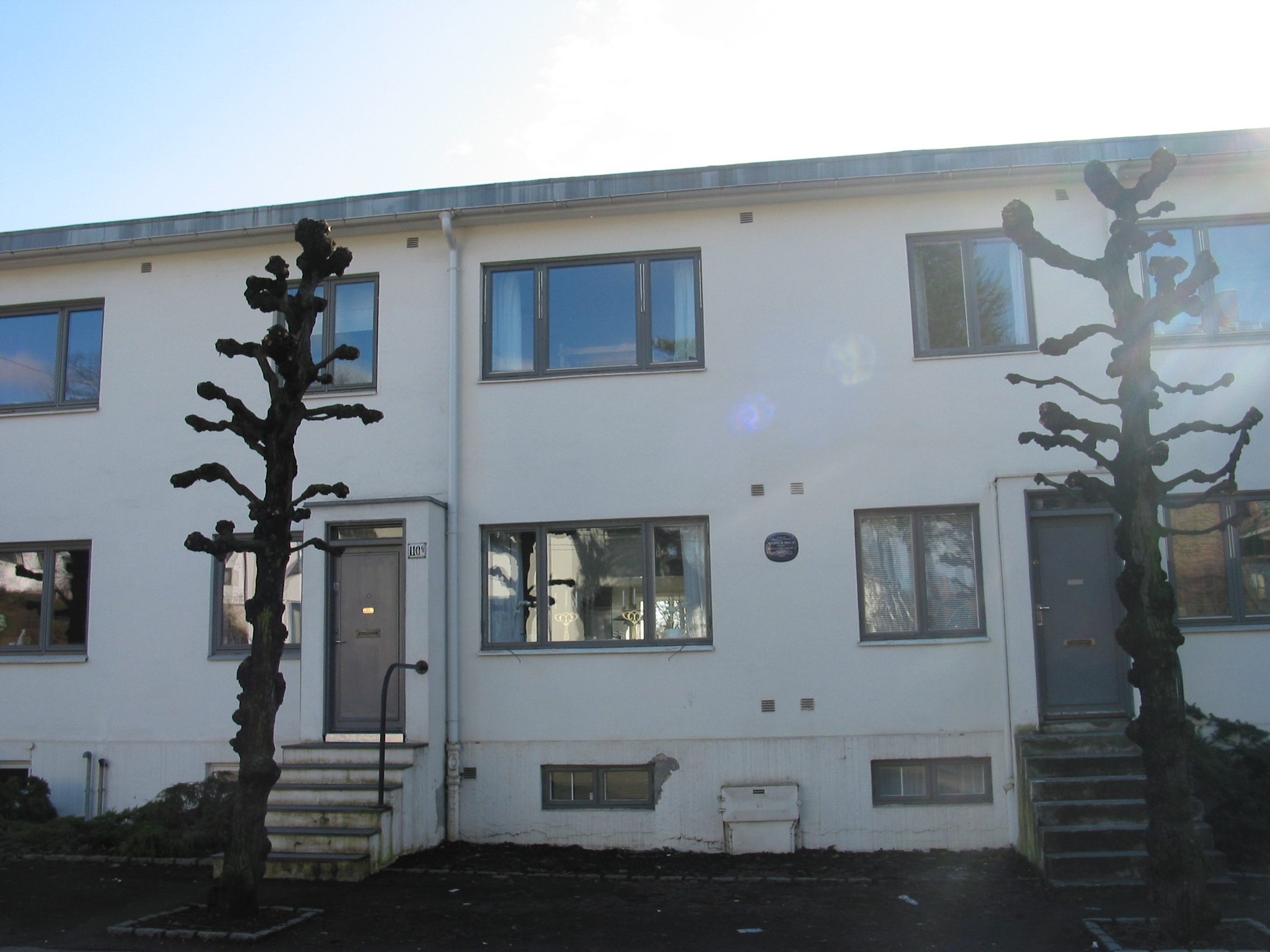
Reich's home in Frogner, Oslo. A blue plaque, in Norwegian, reads: "The physician and psychoanalyst WILHELM REICH (1897–1957) lived and worked here 1935–39. Developed character analysis and the body-oriented therapy."

According to Sharaf, 1934–1937 was the happiest period of Reich's personal life, despite the professional problems. His relationship with Elsa Lindenberg was good and he considered marrying her. When she became pregnant in 1935, they were initially overjoyed, buying clothes and furniture for the child, but doubts developed for Reich, who saw the future as too unsettled. To Lindenberg's great distress, Sharaf writes, Reich insisted on an abortion, at that time illegal. They went to Berlin, where the psychoanalyst Edith Jacobson helped to arrange it.

In 1937, Reich began an affair with a female patient, an actress who had been married to a colleague of his. According to Sigurd Hoel, the analysis would stop because of the relationship, then the relationship would end and the analysis would start up again. The patient eventually threatened to go to the press, but was persuaded that it would harm her as much as it would Reich. Around the same time, Reich also had an affair with Gerd Bergersen, a 25-year-old Norwegian textile designer.

Despite the affairs, Sharaf writes that, as the newspaper campaign against Reich gained pace, he developed an intense jealousy toward Lindenberg, demanding that she not have a separate life of any kind. He even physically assaulted a composer with whom she was working. Lindenberg considered calling the police but decided Reich could not afford another scandal. His behaviour took its toll on their relationship, and when Reich asked her to accompany him to the United States, she refused.

== 1939–1947: United States ==
=== Teaching, second marriage ===
When Hitler annexed Austria in March 1938, Reich's ex-wife and daughters had already left for the United States. Later that year, Theodore P. Wolfe, a professor of psychiatry at Columbia University, traveled to Norway to study under Reich. Wolfe offered to help Reich settle in the States, and managed to arrange an invitation from the New School for Social Research in New York for Reich to teach a course on "Biological Aspects of Character Formation". Wolfe and Walter Briehl, a former student of Reich's, put up $5,000 to guarantee his visa. Wolfe also pulled strings with Adolph Berle, an official in the State Department. Reich wrote in his diary in May 1939:

I am sitting in a completely empty apartment waiting for my American visa. I have misgivings as to how it will go. ... I am utterly and horribly alone! It will be quite an undertaking to carry on all the work in America. Essentially, I am a great man, a rarity, as it were. I can't quite believe it myself, however, and that is why I struggle against playing the role of a great man.

He received the visa in August 1939, and sailed out of Norway on August 19 on the SS Stavangerfjord, the last ship to leave for the United States before the war began on September 3. He began teaching at The New School, where he remained until May 1941, living first at 7502 Kessel Street, Forest Hills, Queens, where he conducted experiments on mice with cancer, injecting them with bions. He built a small Faraday cage to examine the vapors and lights he said the bions were producing. In October 1939, his secretary Gertrud Gaasland introduced him to Ilse Ollendorf, 29 years old at the time. Reich was still in love with Lindenberg, but Ollendorf started organizing his life for him, becoming his bookkeeper and laboratory assistant. They began living together in the Kessel Street house on Christmas Day 1939. She was eight weeks pregnant, but according to Turner he insisted that she have an abortion. Five years later, in 1944, they had a son, Peter, and were married in 1946.

Sharaf writes that Reich's personality changed after his experience in Oslo. He became socially isolated and kept his distance even from old friends and his ex-wife. His students in the United States came to know him as a man that no colleague, no matter how close, called by his first name. In January 1940 he wrote to Lindenberg to end their relationship once and for all, telling her that he was in despair and that he believed he would end up dying like a dog.

=== Orgonomy ===
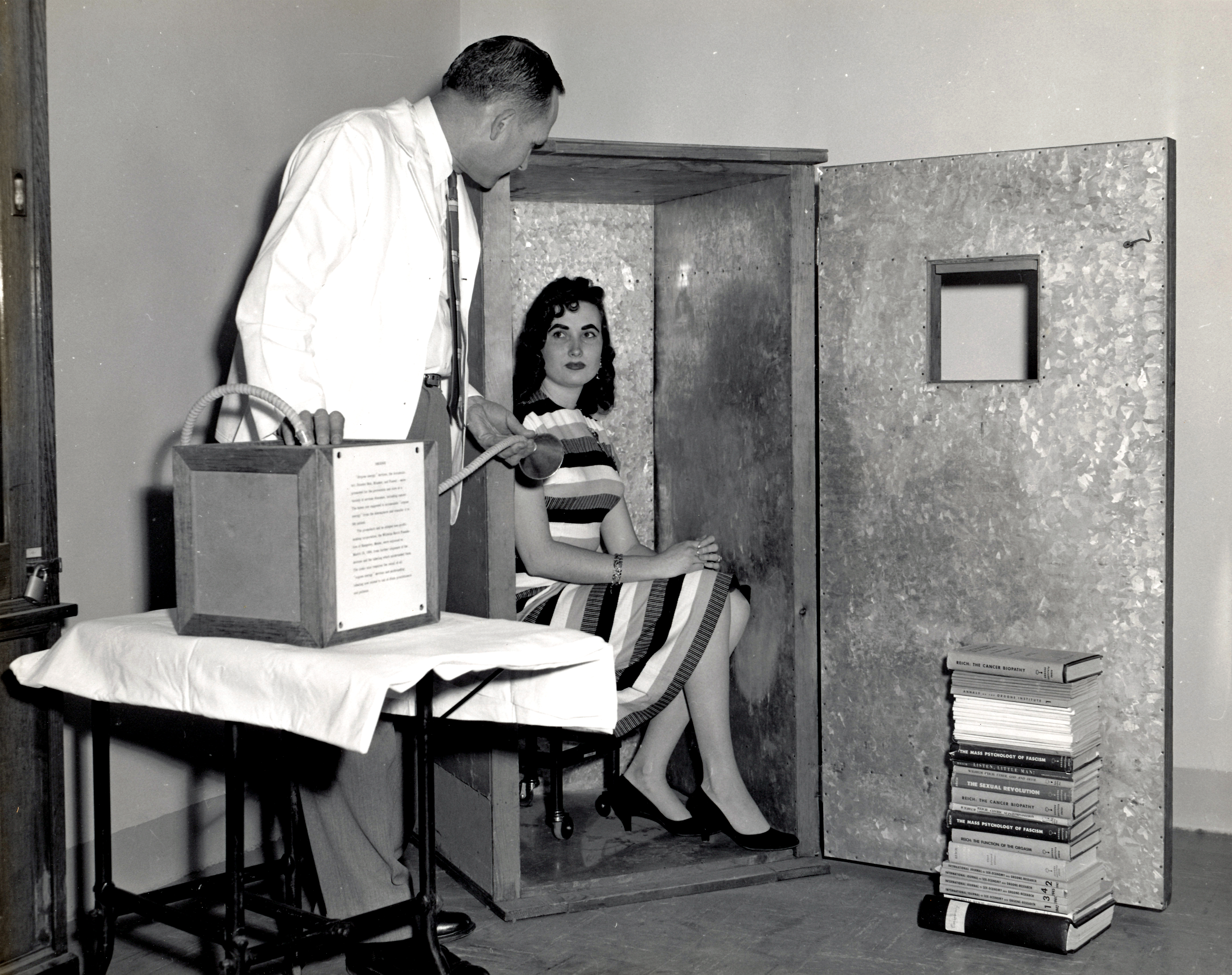
Orgone Accumulator

Orgone Accumulator

It was shortly after he arrived in New York in 1939 that Reich first said he had discovered a biological or cosmic energy, an extension of Freud's idea of the libido. He called it "orgone energy" or "orgone radiation", and the study of it "orgonomy". Reich said he had seen orgone when he injected his mice with bions and in the sky at night through an "organoscope", a special telescope. He argued that it is in the soil and air (indeed, is omnipresent), is blue or blue-grey, and that humanity had divided its knowledge of it in two: aether for the physical aspect and God for the spiritual. The colour of the sky, the northern lights, St Elmo's Fire, and the blue of sexually excited frogs are manifestations of orgone, he wrote. He also argued that protozoa, red corpuscles, cancer cells and the chlorophyll of plants are charged with it.

In 1940, he began to build insulated Faraday cages, "orgone accumulators", that he said would concentrate the orgone. The earliest boxes were for laboratory animals. The first human-sized, five-foot-tall box was built in December 1940, and set up in the basement of his house. Turner writes that it was made of plywood lined with rock wool and sheet iron, and had a chair inside and a small window. The boxes had multiple layers of these materials, which caused the orgone concentration inside the box to be three to five times stronger than in the air, Reich said. Patients were expected to sit inside them naked.

The accumulators were tested on plant growth and mice with cancer. Reich wrote to his supporters in July 1941 that orgone is "definitely able to destroy cancerous growth. This is proved by the fact that tumors in all parts of the body are disappearing or diminishing. No other remedy in the world can claim such a thing." Although not licensed to practise medicine in the United States, he began testing the boxes on human beings diagnosed with cancer and schizophrenia. In one case the test had to be stopped prematurely because the subject heard a rumour that Reich was insane; there were stories, which were false, that he had been hospitalized in the Utica State Mental Hospital. In another case the father of an eight-year-old girl with cancer approached him for help, then complained to the American Medical Association that he was practising without a licence. He asked his supporters to stick with him through the criticism, believing that he had developed a grand unified theory of physical and mental health.

=== Experiment with Einstein ===
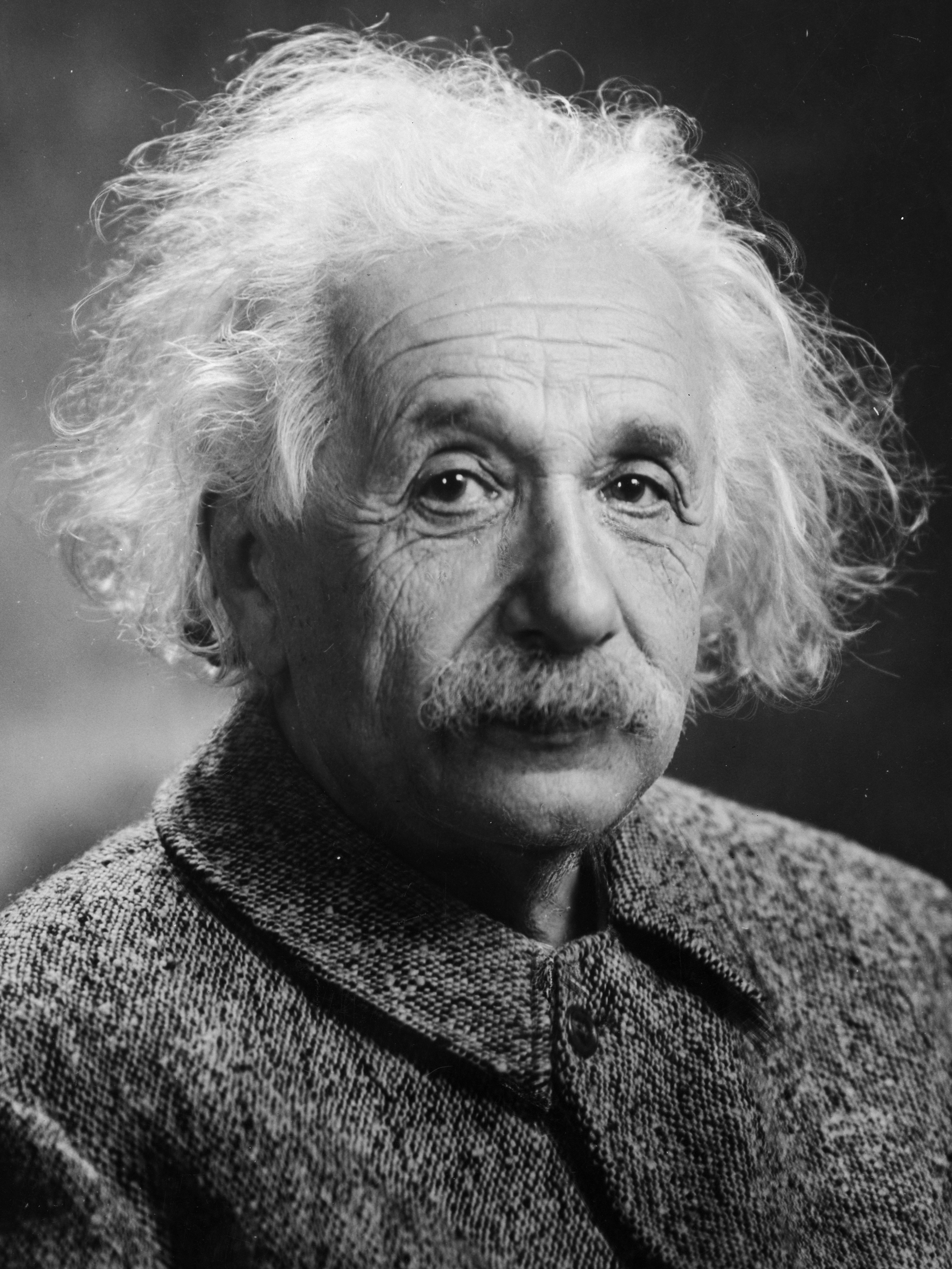
Reich discussed orgone accumulators with Albert Einstein during 1941

In December 1940, Reich wrote to Albert Einstein saying he had a scientific discovery he wanted to discuss, and in January 1941 visited Einstein at his home in Princeton, where they talked for nearly five hours. He told Einstein that he had discovered a "specific biologically effective energy which behaves in many respects differently to all that is known about electromagnetic energy". He said it could be used against disease, and as a weapon "in the fight against the Fascist pestilence". Einstein had signed a letter to President Roosevelt in August 1939 to warn of the danger of Nazi Germany building an atom bomb, and had urged the United States to establish its own research project. Einstein agreed that if an object's temperature could be raised without an apparent heating source, as Reich was suggesting, it would be "a bomb".

Reich was much encouraged by the meeting and hoped he would be invited to join Princeton's Institute for Advanced Study. During their next meeting, he gave Einstein a small accumulator, and over the next 10 days Einstein performed experiments with it in his basement, which involved taking the temperature above, inside and near the device, and stripping it down to its Faraday cage to compare temperatures. He observed an increase of temperature, which Reich argued was caused by orgone. (Note: Einstein to Reich, 7 February 1941: "I have now investigated your apparatus ... In the beginning I made enough readings without any changes in your arrangements. The box-thermometer showed regularly a temperature of about 0.3–0.4 higher than the one suspended freely.") One of Einstein's assistants pointed out that the temperature was lower on the floor than on the ceiling. (Note: Einstein to Reich, 7 February 1941: "One of my assistants now drew my attention to the fact that in the room ... the temperature on the floor is always lower than the one on the ceiling.") Einstein concluded that the effect was simply due to the temperature gradient inside the room. "Through these experiments I regard the matter as completely solved", he wrote to Reich on 7 February 1941.

Reich responded with a 25-page letter in which he tried to change Einstein's mind. To rule out the influence of convection he told Einstein that he had taken certain measures, including introducing a horizontal plate above the accumulator, wrapping it in a blanket, hanging it from the ceiling, burying it underground and placing it outside. He wrote that in all these circumstances the temperature difference remained, and was in fact more marked in the open air. (Note: Reich to Einstein: "The original arrangement of the apparatus results, under all circumstances, in a temperature difference between the thermometer in the box and the control thermometer, in the absence of any known kind of constant heat source.") Einstein did not respond to this or to Reich's future correspondence—Reich would write regularly reporting the results of his experiments—until Reich threatened three years later to publish their previous exchange. Einstein replied that he could not devote any further time to the matter and asked that his name not be misused for advertising purposes. Reich believed that Einstein's change of heart was part of a conspiracy of some kind, perhaps related to the communists or prompted by the rumours that Reich was ill. Reich published the correspondence in 1953 as The Einstein Affair.

=== Arrest by the FBI ===
Reich lost his position at the New School in May 1941, after writing to its director, Alvin Johnson, to say he had saved several lives in secret experiments with the accumulator. Johnson was aware of Reich's claims that he could cure cancer, and told him the New School was not an appropriate institution for the work. Reich was also evicted from Kessel Street after his neighbours complained about the animal experiments. His supporters, including Walter Briehl, gave him $14,000 to buy a house, and he settled into 9906 69th Avenue.

On 12 December 1941, five days after the attack on Pearl Harbor and a day after Germany declared it was at war with the United States, Reich was arrested in his home at 2 a.m. by the FBI and taken to Ellis Island, where he was held for over three weeks. He identified himself at the time as the Associate Professor of Medical Psychology, Director of the Orgone Institute. He was at first left to sleep on the floor in a large hall, surrounded by members of the fascist German American Bund, who Reich feared might kill him, but when his psoriasis returned he was transferred to the hospital ward. He was questioned about several books the FBI found when they searched his home, including Hitler's Mein Kampf, Trotsky's My Life, a biography of Lenin and a Russian alphabet book for children. After threatening to go on hunger strike he was released, on 5 January, but his name remained on the "key figures list" of the Enemy Alien Control Unit, which meant he was placed under surveillance.

Turner writes that it seems Reich was the victim of mistaken identity; there was a William Reich who ran a bookstore in New Jersey, which was used to distribute Communist material. The FBI acknowledged the mistake in November 1943 and closed Reich's file. In 2000 it released 789 pages of the file:

This German immigrant described himself as the Associate Professor of Medical Psychology, Director of the Orgone Institute, President and research physician of the Wilhelm Reich Foundation and discoverer of biological or life energy. A 1940 security investigation was begun to determine the extent of Reich's communist commitments. A board of Alien Enemy Hearing judged that Dr. Reich was not a threat to the security of the U.S. In 1947, a security investigation concluded that neither the Orgone Project nor any of its staff were engaged in subversive activities or were in violation of any statute within the jurisdiction of the FBI.

=== Purchase of Orgonon ===
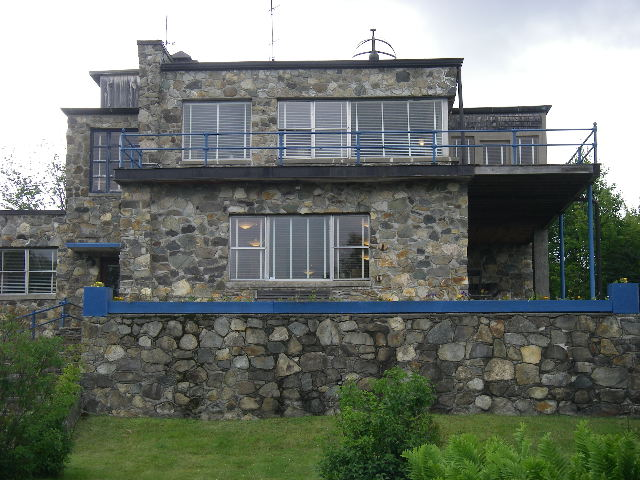
Wilhelm Reich Museum, Orgonon

In November 1942, Reich purchased an old farm for $4,000 on Dodge Pond, Maine, near Rangeley, with 280 acres (1.1 km^{2}) of land. Calling it Orgonon, he started spending summers there, and had a one-room cabin built in 1943, a laboratory in 1945, a larger cabin in 1946, and an observatory in 1948.

In 1950, he decided to live there year-round, and in May that year moved from New York with Ilse, their son, Peter, and Reich's daughter Eva, with the idea of creating a centre for the study of orgone. Several colleagues moved there with him, including two physicians with an interest in orgone, and Lois Wyvell, who ran the Orgone Press Institute. The artist William Moise joined Reich as an assistant at Orgonon, later marrying Eva Reich. Orgonon still houses the Wilhelm Reich Museum, as well as holiday cottages available to rent, one of which is the cottage in which the Reichs lived.

== 1947–1957: Legal problems ==
=== Brady articles, FDA ===
Until 1947, Reich enjoyed largely uncritical attention from the press in the United States. One journal, Psychosomatic Medicine, had called orgone a "surrealist creation", but his psychoanalytic work had been discussed in the Journal of the American Medical Association and the American Journal of Psychiatry, The Nation had given his writing positive reviews, and he was listed in American Men of Science.

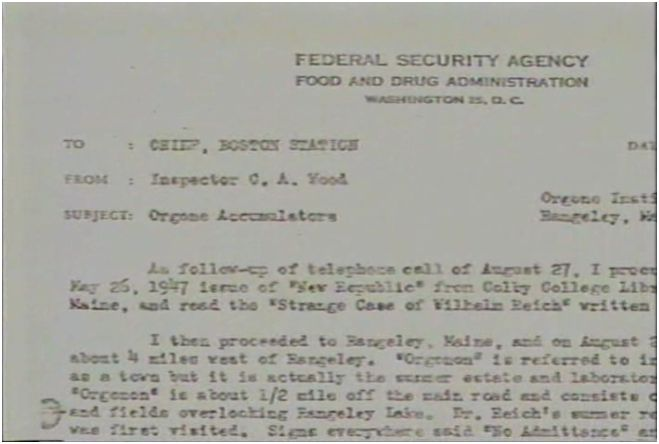
August 1947 letter from the FDA about Reich, referencing the Brady article

His reputation took a sudden downturn in April and May 1947, when articles by Mildred Edie Brady were published in Harper's and The New Republic, the latter entitled "The Strange Case of Wilhelm Reich", with the subhead, "The man who blames both neuroses and cancer on unsatisfactory sexual activities has been repudiated by only one scientific journal." Brady's ultimate target was not Reich but psychoanalysis, which according to Turner she saw as akin to astrology.

Of Reich she wrote: "Orgone, named after the sexual orgasm, is, according to Reich, a cosmic energy. It is, in fact, the cosmic energy. Reich has not only discovered it; he has seen it, demonstrated it and named a town—Orgonon, Maine—after it. Here he builds accumulators of it, which are rented out to patients, who presumably derive 'orgastic potency' from it." (Note: According to his estate, Reich rejected the idea that the accumulator could provide orgastic potency. He wrote in 1950: "The orgone accumulator, as has been clearly stated in the relevant publications (The Cancer Biopathy, etc.), cannot provide orgastic potency.") She claimed, falsely, that he had said the accumulators could cure not only impotence but cancer. Brady argued that the "growing Reich cult" had to be dealt with. On his copy of the New Republic article, Reich wrote "THE SMEAR". He issued a press release, but no one published it.

In July 1947, Dr. J. J. Durrett, director of the Medical Advisory Division of the Federal Trade Commission, wrote to the Food and Drug Administration (FDA) asking them to investigate Reich's claims about the health benefits of orgone. The FDA assigned an investigator to the case, who learned that Reich had built 250 accumulators. The FDA concluded that they were dealing with a "fraud of the first magnitude". According to Sharaf, the FDA suspected a sexual racket of some kind; questions were asked about the women associated with orgonomy and "what was done with them". From that point on, Reich's work came increasingly to the attention of the authorities.

=== Orgonomic Infant Research Center ===
Reich established the Orgonomic Infant Research Center (OIRC) in 1950, with the aim of preventing muscular armouring in children from birth. Meetings were held in the basement of his house in Forest Hills. Turner wrote that several children who were treated by OIRC therapists later said they had been sexually abused by the therapists, although not by Reich. One woman said she was assaulted by one of Reich's associates when she was five years old. Children were asked to stand naked in front of Reich and a group of 30 therapists in his basement, while Reich described the children's "blockages". Reich's daughter, Lore Reich Rubin, told Turner that she believed Reich himself had been abused as a child, which is why he developed such an interest in sex and childhood sexuality.

The sexual allegations apart, several people discussed how the vegetotherapy had hurt them physically as children, as therapists pressed hard on the body to loosen muscular armour. Reich's son, Peter, wrote in his autobiography, Book of Dreams (1973) about the pain this had caused him. Susanna Steig, the niece of William Steig, the New Yorker cartoonist, wrote about being pressed so hard during Reichian therapy that she had difficulty breathing, and said that a woman therapist had sexually assaulted her. According to Turner, a nurse complained in 1952 to the New York Medical Society that an OIRC therapist had taught her five-year-old son how to masturbate. The therapist was arrested, but the case was dropped when Reich agreed to close the OIRC.

=== Divorce, cloudbusters ===
Reich with one of his cloudbusters

Reich and Ilse Ollendorff divorced in September 1951, ostensibly because he thought she had an affair. She continued working with him for another three years. Even after the divorce, he suspected her of having affairs, and persuaded her to sign confessions about her feelings of fear and hatred toward him, which he locked away in the archives of his Orgone Institute. He wrote several documents denouncing her, while having an affair himself with Lois Wyvell, who ran the Orgone Institute Press.

In 1951, Reich said he had discovered another energy that he called deadly orgone radiation (DOR), accumulations of which played a role in desertification. He designed a "cloudbuster", rows of 15-foot aluminium pipes mounted on a mobile platform, connected to cables that were inserted into water. He believed that it could unblock orgone energy in the atmosphere and cause rain. Turner described it as an "orgone box turned inside out".

He conducted dozens of experiments with the cloudbuster, calling his research "Cosmic Orgone Engineering". During a drought in 1953, two farmers in Maine offered to pay him if he could make it rain to save their blueberry crop. Reich used the cloudbuster on the morning of July 6, and according to the Bangor Daily News—based on an account from an anonymous eyewitness who was probably Peter Reich—rain began to fall that evening. The crop survived, the farmers declared themselves satisfied, and Reich received his fee. (Note: Bangor's Daily News reported on 24 July 1953: "Dr. Reich and three assistants set up their 'rain-making device off the shore of Grand Lake, near the Bangor hydro-electric dam ... The device, a set of hollow tubes, suspended over a small cylinder, connected by a cable, conducted a 'drawing' operation for about an hour and ten minutes ... "According to a reliable source in Ellsworth, the following climactic changes took place in that city on the night of July 6 and the early morning of July 7: 'Rain began to fall shortly after ten o'clock Monday evening, first as a drizzle and then by midnight as a gentle, steady rain. Rain continued throughout the night, and a rainfall of 0.24 inches was recorded in Ellsworth the following morning.' "A puzzled witness to the 'rain-making' process said: 'The queerest looking clouds you ever saw began to form soon after they got the thing rolling.' And later the same witness said the scientists were able to change the course of the wind by manipulation of the device.")

=== Injunction ===
Over the years the FDA interviewed physicians, Reich's students and his patients, asking about the orgone accumulators. A professor at the University of Oregon who bought an accumulator told an FDA inspector that he knew the device was phony, but found it helpful because his wife sat quietly in it for four hours every day.

The attention of the FDA triggered belligerent responses from Reich, who called them "HiGS" (hoodlums in government) and the tools of red fascists. He developed a delusion that he had powerful friends in government, including President Eisenhower, who he believed would protect him, and that the U.S. Air Force was flying over Orgonon to make sure that he was all right. On 29 July 1952 three inspectors arrived at Orgonon unannounced. Sharaf writes that Reich detested unannounced visitors; he had once chased some people away with a gun just for looking at an adjacent property. He told the inspectors they had to read his work before he would interact with them, and ordered them to leave.

In February 1954, the United States Attorney for the District of Maine filed a 27-page complaint seeking a permanent injunction, under Sections 301 and 302 of the Federal Food, Drug, and Cosmetic Act, to prevent interstate shipment of orgone accumulators and to ban promotional literature. Reich refused to appear in court, arguing that no court was in a position to evaluate his work. In a letter to Judge John D. Clifford, Jr. in February, he wrote:

My factual position in the case as well as in the world of science of today does not permit me to enter the case against the Food and Drug Administration, since such action would, in my mind, imply admission of the authority of this special branch of the government to pass judgment on primordial, pre-atomic cosmic orgone energy. I, therefore, rest the case in full confidence in your hands.

The injunction was granted by default on 19 March 1954. The judge ordered that all accumulators, parts and instructions be destroyed, and that several of Reich's books that mentioned orgone be withheld.

=== Chasing UFOs ===
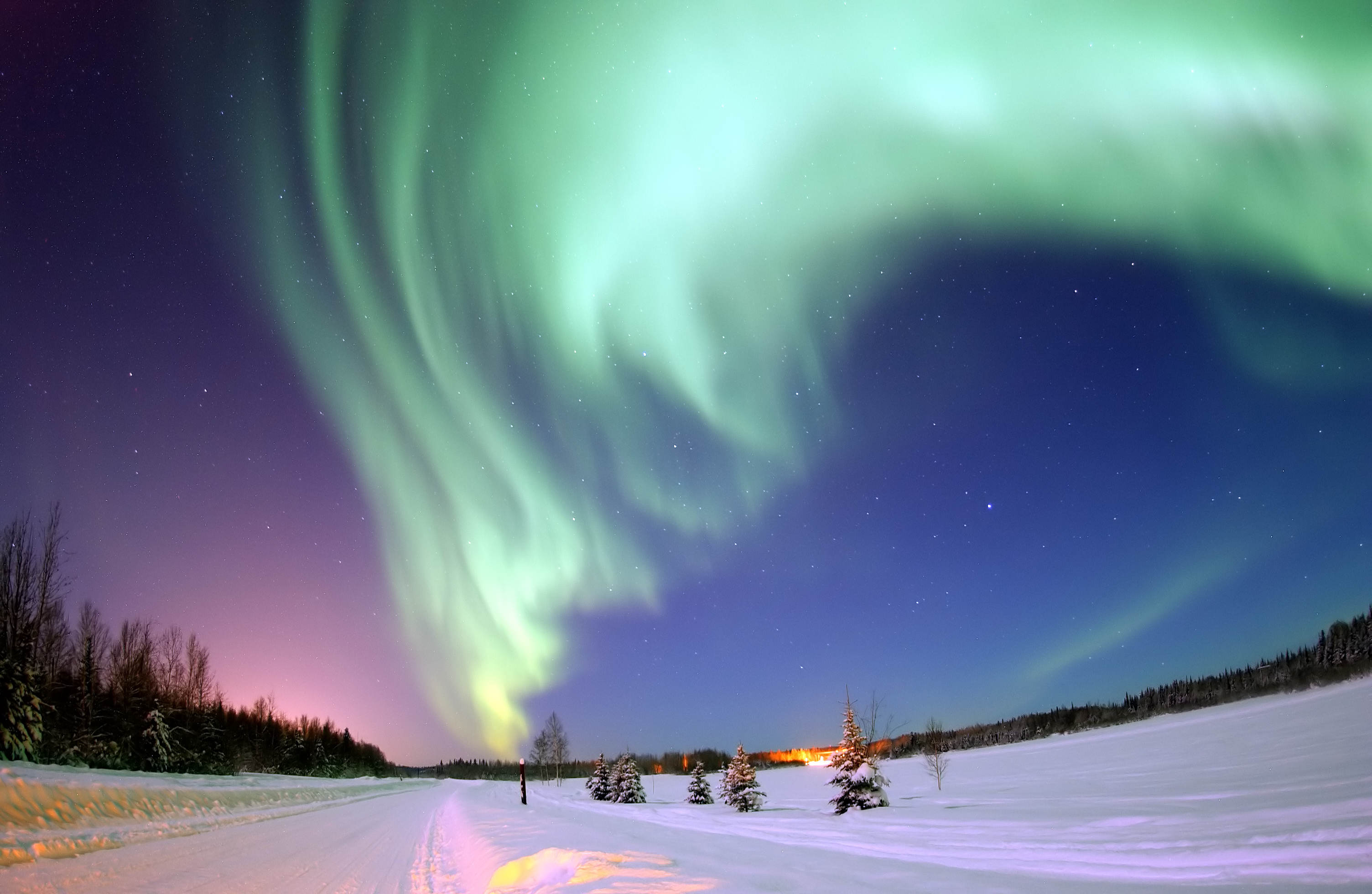
Reich argued that orgone was responsible for the colour of the northern lights.

According to Turner, the injunction triggered a further deterioration in Reich's mental health. From at least early 1954, he came to believe that the planet was under attack by UFOs, which he called "energy alphas". He said he often saw them flying over Orgonon, shaped like thin cigars with windows, leaving streams of black Deadly Orgone Radiation in their wake, which he believed the aliens were scattering to destroy the Earth.

Reich and his son would spend their nights searching for UFOs through telescopes and binoculars, and sometimes, when they believed they had found one, they would roll out a cloudbuster to suck the energy out of it (the perceived-or-imagined-UFO). Reich claimed he had shot several of them down. Armed with two cloudbusters, they fought what Reich called a "full-scale interplanetary battle" in Arizona, where he had rented a house as a base station. In Contact with Space (1956), he wrote of the "very remote possibility" that his own father had been from outer space.

In Wilhelm Reich versus The Flying Saucers, James Reich (unrelated) takes the view that Reich's involvement with UFO phenomena can be traced to his introjection of cinematic content, not least The Day the Earth Stood Still (1951).

In late 1954, Reich began an affair with Grethe Hoff, a former patient. Hoff was married to another former student and patient of his, the psychologist Myron Sharaf, who decades later, with his Fury on Earth (1983), became Reich's main biographer. Hoff and Sharaf had had their first child the year before Hoff left him for Reich; the marriage was never repaired although the affair had ended by June 1955. Two months later Reich began another relationship, this time with Aurora Karrer, a medical researcher, and, in November, he moved out of Orgonon to an apartment in Alban Towers, Washington, D.C., to live with her, using the pseudonym Dr. Walter Roner.

=== Contempt of court ===
While Reich was in Arizona in May 1956, one of his associates sent an accumulator part through the mail to another state, in violation of the injunction, after an FDA inspector posing as a customer requested it. Reich and another associate, Dr. Michael Silvert, were charged with contempt of court; Silvert had been looking after the inventory in Reich's absence. Reich at first refused to attend court, and was arrested and held for two days until a supporter posted bail of $30,000.

Representing himself during the hearing, he admitted the violation but pleaded not guilty and hinted at conspiracies. During a recess the judge apparently suggested a psychiatric evaluation to Reich's ex-wife, Ilse Ollendorff, but this was not communicated to Reich. The jury found him guilty on 7 May 1956, and he was sentenced to two years' imprisonment. Silvert was sentenced to a year and a day, the Wilhelm Reich Foundation was fined $10,000, and the accumulators and associated literature were to be destroyed.

=== Book burning ===
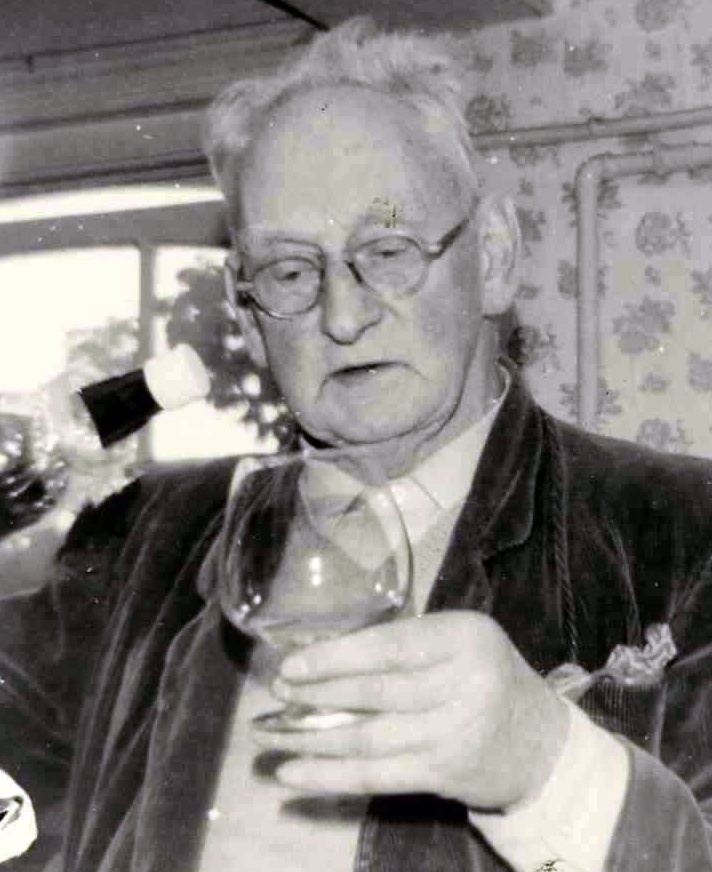
A. S. Neill opposed the destruction of Reich's books

On 5 June 1956, two FDA officials arrived at Orgonon to supervise the destruction of the accumulators. Most of them had been sold by that time and another 50 were with Silvert in New York, leaving only three accumulators at Orgonon. The FDA agents were not allowed to destroy them, only to supervise the destruction, so Reich's friends and his son, Peter, chopped them up with axes as the agents watched. Once they were destroyed, Reich placed an American flag on top of them.

On 26 June, the agents returned to supervise the destruction of the promotional material, including 251 copies of Reich's books. The American Civil Liberties Union issued a press release criticizing the book burning, although coverage of the release was poor, and Reich ended up asking them not to help because he was annoyed that they had failed to criticize the destruction of the accumulators. In England, A. S. Neill and the poet Herbert Read signed a letter of protest, but it was never published. On July 23 the remaining accumulators in New York were destroyed by S. A. Collins and Sons, who had built them.

On 23 August, six tons of Reich's books, journals and papers were burned in New York, at the Gansevoort incinerator, a public incinerator on 25th Street. The material included copies of several of his books, including The Sexual Revolution, Character Analysis and The Mass Psychology of Fascism. Although these had been published in German before Reich ever discussed orgone, he had added mention of it to the English editions, so they were caught by the injunction. It has been cited as one of the worst examples of censorship in U.S. history. As with the accumulators, the FDA was supposed only to observe the destruction. The psychiatrist Victor Sobey (d. 1995), an associate of Reich's, wrote:

All the expenses and labor had to be provided by the [Orgone Institute] Press. A huge truck with three to help was hired. I felt like people who, when they are to be executed, are made to dig their own graves first and are then shot and thrown in. We carried box after box of the literature.

=== Imprisonment ===
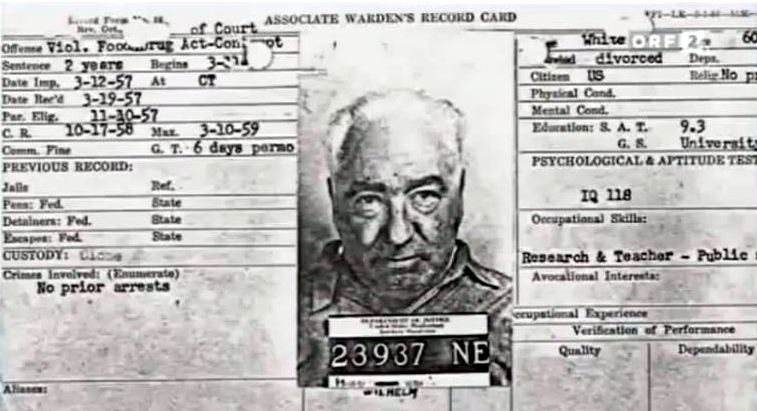
Reich's record card from the Lewisburg Federal Penitentiary

Reich appealed the lower court's decision in October 1956, but the Court of Appeals upheld it on 11 December. He wrote several times to J. Edgar Hoover, director of the FBI, requesting a meeting, and appealed to the Supreme Court, which decided on 25 February 1957 not to review the case. On 12 March 1957 Reich and Silvert were sent to Danbury Federal Prison. (Silvert committed suicide in May 1958, five months after his release.) Richard C. Hubbard, a psychiatrist who admired Reich, examined him on admission, recording paranoia manifested by delusions of grandiosity, persecution, and ideas of reference:

The patient feels that he has made outstanding discoveries. Gradually over a period of many years he has explained the failure of his ideas in becoming universally accepted by the elaboration of psychotic thinking. "The Rockerfellows [sic] are against me." (Delusion of grandiosity.) "The airplanes flying over prison are sent by the Air Force to encourage me." (Ideas of reference and grandiosity.)

On March 19, Reich was transferred to the Lewisburg Federal Penitentiary and examined again. This time it was decided that he was mentally competent and that his personality seemed intact, though he might become psychotic when stressed. A few days later, on his 60th birthday, he wrote to his son, Peter, then 13:

I am in Lewisburg. I am calm, certain in my thoughts, and doing mathematics most of the time. I am kind of "above things", fully aware of what is up. Do not worry too much about me, though anything might happen. I know, Pete, that you are strong and decent. At first I thought that you should not visit me here. I do not know. With the world in turmoil I now feel that a boy your age should experience what is coming his way—fully digest it without getting a "belly ache", so to speak, nor getting off the right track of truth, fact, honesty, fair play, and being above board—never a sneak ... .

He applied for a presidential pardon in May, to no avail. Peter visited him in jail several times, where one prisoner said Reich was known as the "flying saucer guy" and the "Sex Box man". Reich told Peter that he cried a lot, and wanted Peter to let himself cry too, believing that tears are the "great softener". His last letter to his son was on 22 October 1957, when he said he was looking forward to being released on 10 November, having served one third of his sentence. A parole hearing had been scheduled for a few days before that date. He wrote that he and Peter had a date for a meal at the Howard Johnson restaurant near Peter's school. Peter's mother Ilse, who was a Quaker, stated that Wilhelm attended some Protestant services during his imprisonment and sent his son various prayers.

=== Death ===
Reich failed to appear for roll call on 3 November 1957, and was found at 7 a.m. in his bed. The prison doctor said he had died during the night of "myocardial insufficiency with sudden heart failure". He was buried in a vault at Orgonon that he had asked his caretaker to dig in 1955. He had left instructions that there was to be no religious ceremony, but that a record should be played of Schubert's "Ave Maria" sung by Marian Anderson, and that his granite headstone should read simply: "Wilhelm Reich, Born March 24, 1897, Died ... " None of the academic journals carried an obituary. Time magazine wrote on 18 November 1957:

Died. Wilhelm Reich, 60, once-famed psychoanalyst, associate and follower of Sigmund Freud, founder of the Wilhelm Reich Foundation, lately better known for unorthodox sex and energy theories; of a heart attack; in Lewisburg Federal Penitentiary, Pa; where he was serving a two-year term for distributing his invention, the "orgone energy accumulator" (in violation of the Food and Drug Act), a telephone-booth-size device that supposedly gathered energy from the atmosphere, and could cure, while the patient sat inside, common colds, cancer, and impotence.

== Reception and legacy ==
=== Psychotherapy ===
The psychoanalyst Richard Sterba wrote in 1982 that Reich had been a brilliant clinician and teacher in the 1920s; even the older analysts had wanted to attend his technical seminars in Vienna. But according to Sharaf, they came to consider Reich as paranoid and belligerent. Psychologist Luis Cordon wrote that Reich's slide from respectability concluded with the consensus inside and outside the psychoanalytic community that he was at best a crackpot and perhaps seriously ill.

There were inaccurate rumours from the late 1920s that he had been hospitalized. Paul Federn became Reich's second analyst in 1922; he later said he had detected "incipient schizophrenia" and called Reich a psychopath. Similarly, Sandor Rado had Reich as an analyst and in 1931 declared him schizophrenic "in the most serious way". Reich's daughter, Lore Reich Rubin, a psychiatrist, speculated that he had bipolar disorder and may have been sexually abused as a child.

Sharaf argued that psychoanalysts tended to dismiss as ill anyone from within the fold who had transgressed, and this was never done so relentlessly as with Reich. His work was split into the pre-psychotic "good" and the post-psychotic "bad", the date of the illness's onset depending on which parts of his work a speaker disliked. Psychoanalysts preferred to see him as sane in the 1920s because of his work on character, while political radicals regarded him as sane in the 1930s because of his Marxist-oriented research.

Despite Reich's precarious mental health, his work on character and the idea of muscular armouring contributed to the development of what is now known as ego psychology, gave rise to body psychotherapy, and helped shape the Gestalt therapy of Fritz Perls, the bioenergetic analysis of Reich's student Alexander Lowen, and the primal therapy of Arthur Janov.

=== Humanities ===
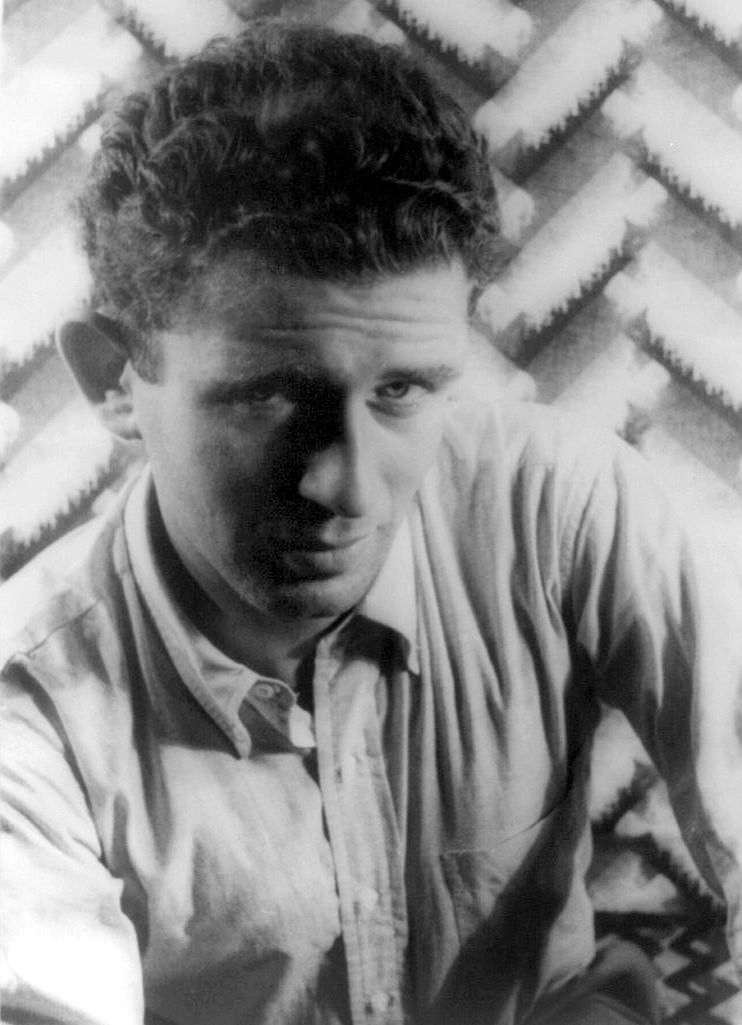
Norman Mailer owned several orgone accumulators.

Reich's work influenced a generation of intellectuals, including Saul Bellow, William Burroughs and Norman Mailer, and the founder of Summerhill School in England, A. S. Neill. The French philosopher Michel Foucault wrote in The History of Sexuality (1976) that the impact of Reich's critique of sexual repression had been substantial.

The Austrian-American philosopher Paul Edwards said that the FDA's pursuit of Reich had intensified Edwards' attachment to him. He wrote in 1977 that for years he and his friends regarded Reich as "something akin to a messiah". Paul Mathews and John M. Bell started teaching a course on Reich in 1968 at New York University through its Division of Continuing Study, and it was still being taught at the time Sharaf was writing Reich's biography in 1983, making it the longest-running course ever taught in that division.

Several well-known figures used orgone accumulators, including Orson Bean, Sean Connery, Allen Ginsberg, Paul Goodman, Jack Kerouac, Isaac Rosenfeld, J. D. Salinger, William Steig and Robert Anton Wilson. Norman Mailer—who owned several orgone accumulators, including some in the shape of eggs—wrote about Reich enthusiastically in The Village Voice, as a result of which Orgonon became a place of pilgrimage and the orgasm a symbol of liberation.

=== Popular culture ===
The 1985 song "Cloudbusting" by Kate Bush recounts Reich's arrest through his son's eyes.

Reich continued to influence popular culture after his death. Turner writes that the evil Dr. Durand Durand (Milo O'Shea) in the feature film Barbarella (1968) seems to be based on Reich; he places Barbarella (Jane Fonda) in his Excessive Machine so that she would die of pleasure, but rather than killing her the machine burns out. A film about Reich and the implications of his ideas, W.R.: Mysteries of the Organism (1971), was made by Yugoslav director Dušan Makavejev. An orgone accumulator made an appearance as the Orgasmatron in Woody Allen's comedy feature film Sleeper (1973). The use of orgone accumulators, a cloudbuster and representations of Reich's orgone therapy with patients, together with a snapshot of the FDA's hostile actions against Reich were dramatised in a short film called It Can Be Done, which was made by British director Jon East in 1999. The film screened at the 56th Venice Film Festival on 11 September 1999.

Patti Smith's "Birdland" on her album Horses (1975) is based on Reich's life. Hawkwind's song "Orgone Accumulator", on their album Space Ritual (1973) is named for his invention. In Bob Dylan's "Joey" from Desire (1976), the eponymous gangster spends his time in prison reading Nietzsche and Reich. Reich is also a character in the opera Marilyn (1980) by Italian composer Lorenzo Ferrero.

Kate Bush's single "Cloudbusting" (1985) described Reich's arrest through the eyes of his son, Peter, who wrote his father's story in A Book of Dreams (1973). The video for the song features Donald Sutherland as Reich and Bush as Peter. Robert Anton Wilson's play, Wilhelm Reich in Hell (1987), is about Reich's confrontation with the American government. Four-beat Rhythm: The Writings of Wilhelm Reich (2013) is a compilation album on which Reich's writings are adapted to music. The Australian designer Marc Newson has produced a range of orgone furniture, most famously his Orgone Chair (1993). In James Reich's novel Soft Invasions (2017), a fictionalized Wilhelm Reich is treating a Hollywood mogul using an orgone accumulator. Finnish artist Ville Kallio has released a video game Psycho Patrol R, that features a sci-fi world where orgone energy powers mechs and Reich is respected as a prominent scientist.

=== Science ===
The scientific community dismissed Reich's orgone theory as pseudoscience. (Note: Kenneth S. Isaacs (psychoanalyst), 1999: "Orgone—a useless fiction with faulty basic premises, thin partial theory, and unsubstantiated application results. It was quickly discredited and cast away." Henry H. Bauer, 2000: "Reich's personal charisma seems to have misled some number of people into taking his 'science' seriously. His outward behavior was not inconsistent with that of a mainstream scientific investigator. In the light of everyday common sense rather than of deep technical knowledge, his ideas could seem highly defensible. For those who lack familiarity with the real science of matters Reich dealt with, why would orgone be less believable than black holes, a bounded yet infinite universe, or "dark matter" ... ?" Jon E. Roeckelein (psychologist), 2006: "The current consensus of scientific opinion is that Reich's orgone theory is basically a psychoanalytic system gone awry, and is an approach that represents something most ludicrous and totally dismissible.") James Strick, a historian of science at Franklin and Marshall College, wrote in 2015 that the dominant narrative since Reich's death has been that "there is no point in looking more closely at Reich's science because there was no legitimate science from Reich".

From 1960, apparently in response to the book burning, the New York publisher Farrar, Straus and Giroux began republishing his major works. Reichian physicians organized study groups. Reich asked his student and colleague, Dr. Elsworth Baker, to carry the study of orgonomy forward. In 1967 Baker, established the bi-annual Journal of Orgonomy, still published as of 2024, and in 1968 founded the American College of Orgonomy in Princeton, New Jersey. According to Sharaf, contributors to the Journal of Orgonomy who worked in academia often used pseudonyms. The Orgone Biophysical Research Laboratory was founded in 1978 by James DeMeo and the Institute for Orgonomic Science in 1982 by Morton Herskowitz.

There was renewed interest in November 2007, when the Reich archives at the Francis A. Countway Library of Medicine at Harvard University were unsealed; Reich had left instructions that his unpublished papers be stored for 50 years after his death. James E. Strick, a historian of science and later president of the Wilhelm Reich Trust, began studying Reich's laboratory notebooks from the 1935–1939 bion experiments in Norway. In 2015 Harvard University Press published Strick's Wilhelm Reich, Biologist, in which he writes that Reich's work in Oslo "represented the cutting edge of light microscopy and time-lapse micro-cinematography". He argues that the dominant narrative of Reich as a pseudoscientist is incorrect and that Reich's story is "much more complex and interesting".

Speaking to Christopher Turner in 2011, Reich's son, Peter, said of his father, "He was a nineteenth-century scientist; he wasn't a twentieth-century scientist. He didn't practice science the way scientists do today. He was a nineteenth-century mind who came crashing into twentieth-century America. And boom!"

== Works ==
=== Books and selected publications ===
If originally published in German (all works until 1942), information on the first English publication is added in brackets.

==== Vienna period ====
- 1920 "Analysis of Ibsen's Peer Gynt" (in Early Writings: Volume One, 1975)
- 1920 "On a Case of Breakthrough of the Incest Taboo" (in Early Writings: Volume One, 1975)
- 1922 "Two Narcissistic Types" (in Early Writings: Volume One, 1975)
- 1922 "Concerning Specific Forms of Masturbation" (in Early Writings: Volume One, 1975)
- 1922 "Drive and Libido Concepts from Forel to Jung" in (in Early Writings: Volume One , 1975)
- 1923 "Concerning the Energy of Drives" (in Early Writings: Volume One, 1975)
- 1924 "On Genitality: From the Standpoint of Psychoanalytic Prognosis and Therapy" (in Early Writings: Volume One, 1975)
- 1925 "Further Remarks on the Therapeutic Significance of Genital Libido" (in Early Writings: Volume One, 1975)
- 1925 The Impulsive Character (in Early Writings: Volume One, 1975) German text archived
- 1927 Genitality in the Theory and Therapy of Neurosis (1980) [original title The Function of Orgasm: On the Psychopathology and Sociology of Sexual Life]
- 1929 Dialectical Materialism and Psychoanalysis (in Sexpol. Essays 1929–1934, 1972), German text archived [original title Under the Banner of Marxism]
- 1929 "Psychoanalysis as a Natural Science" lecture at Communist Academy, Moscow. (synopsis in Hristeva and Bennett, "Wilhelm Reich in Soviet Russia," International Forum of Psychoanalysis 27 (1), 2018 https://doi.org/10.1080/0803706X.2015.1125018 )
- 1929 "Psychoanalysis in the Soviet Union" (in Sexpol. Essays 1929–1934, 1972)
- 1930 "Sexual Maturity, Abstinence, Marriage Ethic: A Critique of Bourgeois Sexual Reform". (Absorbed in The Imposition of Sexual Morality, 1932)
- 1930 "The Sexual Misery of the Working Masses and the Difficulties of Sexual Reform" (in New German Critique, No. I 1973)
- 1930 "Forbidden Love: Demands for Proletarian Sexual Reform", anonymous (no English translation).

==== Germany, Denmark, Sweden period ====
- 1932 "The Imposition of Sexual Morality " (in Sexpol. Essays 1929–1934, 1972; Revised 3rd ed. The Invasion of Compulsory Sex-Morality, 1951) German text archived
- 1932 "Politicizing the Sexual Problem of Youth" (in Sexpol. Essays 1929–1934, 1972; Revised as "The Sexual Rights of Youth" in Children of the Future, 1983)
- 1933 Character Analysis (2nd ed. 1945, 3rd enlarged ed. 1949) German text archived
- 1933 The Mass Psychology of Fascism (3rd revised and enlarged ed., 1946)
- 1934 "What is Class Consciousness?" using pseudonym Ernst Parell (in Sexpol. Essays 1929–1934, 1972).
- 1934 "Reforming the Labor movement" using pseudonym Ernst Parell (in Sexpol. Essays 1929–1934, 1972).
- 1934 "Orgasm as an Electrophysiological Discharge" (in The Bioelectrical Investigation of Sexuality and Anxiety, 1982)
- 1934 "The Basic Antithesis of Vegetative Life" (in The Bioelectrical Investigation of Sexuality and Anxiety, 1982)

==== Norway period ====
- 1935 "The Masses and the State: On the Question of the Role of the Structure of the Masses in the Socialist Movement" (part of 3rd enlarged edition of The Mass Psychology of Fascism)
- 1935 "Psychic Contact and Vegetative Current" (in 2nd and 3rd ed. of Character Analysis, 1945/1949)
- 1936 The Sexual Revolution: Toward a Self-Governing Character Structure (3rd ed. 1945) [original title Sexuality in the Cultural Struggle: on the Socialist Restructuring of People]
- 1937 "Experimental Results on the Electrical Function of Sexuality and Anxiety" (in The Bioelectrical Investigation of Sexuality and Anxiety, 1982)
- 1937 "Orgasm Reflex, Muscular Posture, and Bodily Expression: On the Technique of Character-analytic Vegetotherapy" (Summarised in The Function of the Orgasm, Discovery of the Orgone: Vol. 1, 1942)
- 1937 People in the State, unpublished manuscript (in revised and edited form part of People in Trouble, 1953)
- 1937 "The Dialectical-Materialist Method of Thinking and Investigation" (became part of The Bion Experiments, 1938)
- 1938 The Bion Experiments: On the Origins of Life (1979)
- 1938 "Bion Experiments on the Cancer Problem" (in Orgonomic Functionalism, Vol. 7, 2019)
- 1939 "Three Experiments with the Static Electroscope" (in Orgone Energy Bulletin 1951, Vol. III No. 3).
- 1939 "The Natural Organization of Work in Work-Democracy" (unpublished English translation)

==== United States period ====
- 1941 "Further Problems in Work-Democracy (unpublished English translation)
- 1942 The Function of the Orgasm, The Discovery of the Orgone: Vol. 1
- 1942 "Biophysical Functionalism and Mechanistic Natural Science"
- 1942 "The Carcinomatous Shrinking Biopathy"
- 1943 "Experimental Orgone Therapy of the Cancer Biopathy"
- 1944 "Thermal and Electroscopical Orgonometry"
- 1945 "Some Mechanisms of the Emotional Plague"
- 1947 "Work Democracy in Action"
- 1948 "Listen, Little Man!"
- 1948 The Cancer Biopathy, The Discovery of the Orgone: Vol. 2
- 1949 Ether, God and Devil
- 1950 "The Orgone Energy Emergency Bulletin"
- 1950 "Children of the Future" – first report on the Orgonomic Infant Research Centre
- 1951 "Armoring in a Newborn Infant"
- 1951 ORANUR First report, 1947–1951: The Oranur Experiment
- 1951 Cosmic Superimposition: Man's Orgonotic Roots in Nature
- 1951 "The Orgone Energy Accumulator, Its Scientific and Medical Use"
- 1953 The Einstein Affair [of 1941]
- 1953 The Murder of Christ, The Emotional Plague of Mankind Vol. 1
- 1953 People in Trouble, The Emotional Plague of Mankind Vol. 2
- 1956 "Re-emergence of Freud's 'Death Instinct' as 'DOR' Energy"
- 1957 Contact with Space: ORANUR Second Report (1951–1956) + OROP Desert Ea (1954–1955) (posthumous)

=== Journals ===
- 1934–1938 (ed.) Zeitschrift für Politische Psychologie und Sexualökonomie (using pseudonym Ernst Parell)
- 1937–1939 (ed.) Klinische und Experimentelle Berichte
- 1942–1945 (ed.) International Journal of Sex-Economy & Orgone Research
- 1947–1949 (ed.) Annals of the Orgone Institute
- 1949–1953 (ed.) Orgone Energy Bulletin
- 1954–1955 (ed.) CORE – Cosmic Orgone Engineering

=== Letters and autobiographical material ===
- 1967 Reich Speaks of Freud (1952 interview)
- 1981 Record of a Friendship: The Correspondence of Wilhelm Reich and A.S. Neill (1936–1957)
- Autobiographical writings published in four volumes:
  - 1988 Passion of Youth: An Autobiography 1897–1922, Mary Boyd Higgins and Chester M. Raphael (eds.)
  - 1994 Beyond Psychology: Letters and Journals 1934–1939, Mary Boyd Higgins (ed.)
  - 1999 American Odyssey: Letters and Journals 1940–1947, Mary Boyd Higgins (ed.)
  - 2012 Where's the Truth?: Letters and Journals 1948–1957, Mary Boyd Higgins (ed.)

=== Compilations ===
- 1960 Selected Writings: An Introduction to Orgonomy
- 1972 Sexpol. Essays 1929–1934
- 1975 Early Writings: Volume One
- 1982 The Bioelectrical Investigation of Sexuality and Anxiety
- 1983 Children of the Future. On the Prevention of Sexual Pathology

== See also ==
- Aether (classical element)
- Aether (mythology)
- Élan vital
- Energy (esotericism)
- Luminiferous aether
- Qi
