= W.R.: Mysteries of the Organism =

1971 film by Dušan Makavejev

- DVD cover of the movie
- Directed by: Dušan Makavejev
- Written by: Dušan Makavejev
- Produced by: Dušan Makavejev
- Cinematography: Aleksandar Petković; Pega Popović
- Edited by: Ivanka Vukasović
- Music by: Bojana Marijan
- Release date: 1971
- Running time: 85 min.
- Countries: Yugoslavia; West Germany
- Languages: Serbo-Croatian; English; Russian

W.R.: Mysteries of the Organism (Serbo-Croatian: W.R. – Misterije organizma / W.R. – Мистерије организма) is a 1971 film by Yugoslav director Dušan Makavejev that explores the relationship between communist politics and sexuality, as well as presenting the controversial life and work of Austrian-American psychoanalyst Wilhelm Reich (1897–1957). The film's narrative structure is unconventional, intermixing fictional and documentary elements.

After initial screenings, both in and out of Yugoslavia, W.R. was banned in that country for the next 16 years. Makavejev was subsequently indicted there on criminal charges of "derision" towards "the state, its agencies, and representatives" after he made intemperate remarks to a West German newspaper about the ban. His exile from his home country lasted until the end of the regime.

== Plot ==
The film intercuts documentary footage and clips from other films—notably the Stalinist propaganda film The Vow (1946)—with an imaginative and satirical narrative about a highly political Yugoslav woman who seduces a visiting Soviet celebrity ice skater. Despite different settings, characters and time periods, the different elements produce a single story of human sexuality and revolution through montage.

The woman, Milena, violates her proletarian convictions (and rejects the sexual advances of a worker) by pursuing a Joseph Stalin-like celebrity ice skater Vladimir Ilyich (Lenin's first name and patronymic), who represents both class oppression and corruption from the West into communist beliefs. She succeeds, with difficulty, in sexual consummation, but V.I. is unable to reconcile his inner conflicts and ends the encounter by decapitating her. Distraught, V.I. sings a Russian song after the murder: "François Villon's Prayer" by Bulat Okudzhava.

=== Sequences ===
==== Tuli Kupferberg ====
Poet and performance artist Tuli Kupferberg of the band The Fugs, dressed as a soldier, parodies war and the sexual nature of some peoples' fascination with guns by stalking affluent New Yorkers on the street and masturbating his toy rifle. The scene is set to The Fugs' 1965 song "Kill for Peace". As part of the film's climax, the gun masturbation imagery is intercut with other orgasmic sequences. This segment highlights Reich's ideas that sexual frustration and violence are connected.

==== Artists ====
Artist Betty Dodson discusses her experiences in drawing acts of masturbation, as well as her discussions within consciousness raising groups about female sexual response. The Dodson sequences are relatively straightforward documentary interviews; Dodson's large scale drawing of a man masturbating dominates the background of the shots. This segment illustrates a freer attitude toward sexuality.

New York artist Nancy Godfrey was among a loose group called Plaster Casters, who were known for taking plaster casts of rock stars' penises. In a meeting with Jim Buckley, co-founder-editor of the porn magazine Screw, Godfrey makes a plaster cast of Buckley's erect penis as a documentary part of the film. The soundtrack features another song by The Fugs, "I'm Gonna Kill Myself Over Your Dead Body", with Tuli Kupferberg satirically mimicking John Wayne in his a cappella vocals.

This scene was a point of contention for censors. On UK video prints Buckley's penis is covered with psychedelic colors added in editing (the cinema version was unusually approved fully uncut).

==== Jackie Curtis ====
Jackie Curtis, a cross-dressing member of Andy Warhol's entourage and star in his films, is shown on the streets of New York enjoying an ice cream cone with a partner. Curtis' appearance highlighted Reich's theories of gender and sexuality.

==== Screw ====
Screw was an underground magazine that pioneered in bringing hardcore pornography into the American mainstream during the late 1960s and early 1970s. The film shows a behind-the-scenes look at the publication, in which editor Jim Buckley casually consorts with his nude models.

==== Alexander Lowen ====
The film features a rare on-screen interview with neo-Reichian therapist Alexander Lowen, the founder of bioenergetic analysis, during a therapy session, including scream treatment.

==== Other sequences ====
Reich's daughter Eva (1924–2008) appears on camera, speaking about her father's work and the sickness of contemporary life.

The Orgonon, Reich's last home and lab near Rangeley, Maine, USA, is seen with brief shots of the interior and exterior, including a cloudbuster.

The film includes re-stagings of scenes from Sergei Eisenstein films, alluding to the montage era of film making in the Soviet Union.

Shots of the incinerator in which Reich's books were burned in New York City are included.

== Cast ==
- Milena Dravić as Milena
- Ivica Vidović as Vladimir Ilyich
- Jagoda Kaloper as Jagoda
- Tuli Kupferberg as US Soldier
- Zoran Radmilović as Radmilović
- Jackie Curtis as herself
- Miodrag Andrić as Soldier
- Živka Matić as Landlady
- Wilhelm Reich as himself (archive footage)
- Mikheil Gelovani as Joseph Stalin (clips from The Vow)
- Jim Buckley as himself
- Betty Dodson as herself
- Nancy Godfrey as herself
- Dragoljub Ivkov
- Nikola Milić
- Milan Jelić
- Myron Sharaf as himself
- Alexander Lowen as himself
- Robert Ollendorff as himself

== Ban ==
The film was shown to the censorship board in 1971, and Dušan stated on that occasion: "I do not want foreigners to show my film as a film that the Yugoslav censorship banned. As an author, I am ready to take on all responsibility: artistic, social and political". The censorship board approved the public screening of the film on that occasion, and on 10 May 1971 the Republic Film Review Commission of the SR Serbia issued the Decision on granting approval for the public screening of the film No. 03-642-45. However, the Public Prosecutor's Office of the SR Serbia sent a letter to the Republic Film Review Commission, in which the public prosecutor, based on Article 15 of the Law on Public Prosecutor's Office, suspended the execution of the Decision of 10 May 1971, which banned the public screening of the film. The public prosecutor gave the following explanation: "given that, by virtue of the right of supervision, he will request the competent republican body to annul it, and on the basis of Article 262, paragraphs 1 and 2 of the Law on General Administrative Procedure".

The film was first publicly shown in Yugoslavia in 1986, when the 1971 ban was lifted.

== Reception ==
W.R. won acclaim from critics at the Cannes Film Festival in 1971, but due to the state ban was shown only to a few selected audiences in Yugoslavia for the next several years.

On the review aggregator website Rotten Tomatoes, 87% of 15 critics' reviews are positive, with an average rating of 7.8/10. Roger Ebert gave the film 4 out of 4 stars. On 28 December 2016 the Yugoslav Film Archive, in accordance with its powers under the Law on Cultural Heritage, listed one hundred Serbian feature films (1911–1999) to be cultural heritage of great importance, including W.R.: Mysteries of the Organism.

== See also ==
- Sweet Movie
- List of mainstream films with unsimulated sex
