= Cloudbuster =

Pseudoscientific rain maker

Reich with one of his cloudbusters

A cloudbuster is a device designed by Austrian psychoanalyst Wilhelm Reich (1897–1957), which Reich claimed could produce rain by manipulating what he called "orgone energy" present in the atmosphere.

The cloudbuster was intended to be used in a way similar to a lightning rod: focusing it on a location in the sky and grounding it in some material that was presumed to absorb orgone—such as a body of water—would draw the orgone energy out of the atmosphere, causing the formation of clouds and rain. Reich conducted dozens of experiments with the cloudbuster, calling the research "Cosmic orgone engineering".

There have been no verified instances of a cloudbuster actually working and producing noticeable weather change, such as causing rain. Orgone therapy is seen as pseudoscience.

A modern reinvention of cloudbuster is being sold under names of chembuster, orgone cannon or akasha pillar. It is marketed as a countermeasure against chemtrails (conspiracy theory relating to aircraft condensation trails).

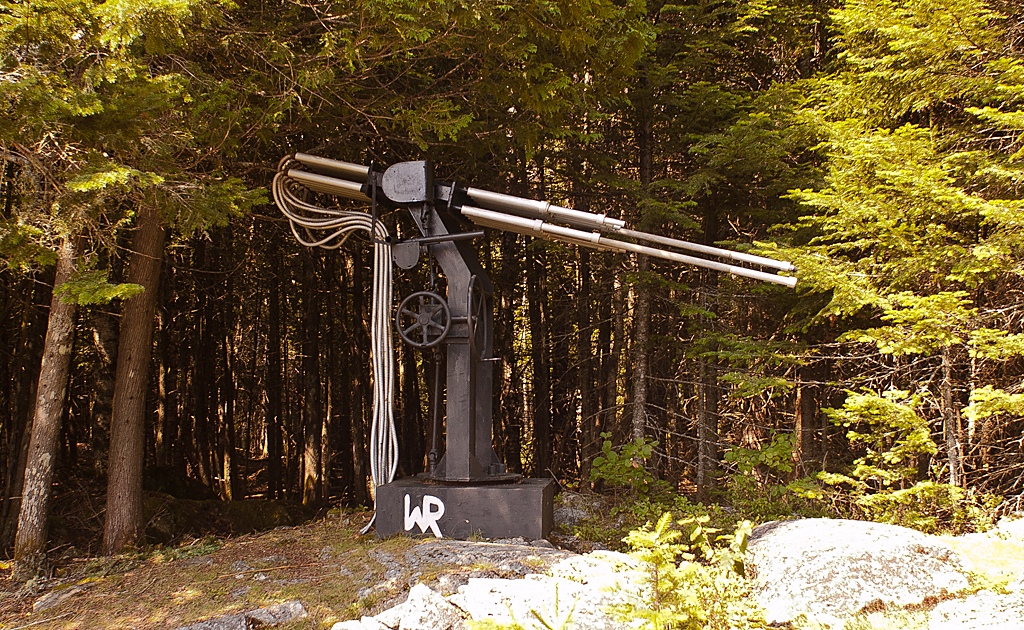
Remains of a cloudbuster located in Maine

== Construction ==
A cloudbuster consists of an array of parallel hollow copper tubes which are connected at the rear to a series of flexible copper hoses which are equal or slightly smaller in diameter to the parallel tubes. Alternatively, the rear of the tubes are joined to a single large diameter pipe and flexible copper hose. The open end of these hoses are placed in water, which Reich believed to be a natural orgone absorber. The pipes can be aimed into areas of the sky to purportedly draw energy to the ground like a lightning rod.

The remains of one of Reich's cloudbusters can be found in Rangeley, Maine at the Orgone Energy Observatory in the Reich Museum.

== In popular culture ==
Wilhelm Reich's cloudbuster at Orgonon can be seen in Dušan Makavejev's 1971 film W.R.: Mysteries of the Organism.

The cloudbuster was the inspiration for the 1985 song "Cloudbusting" by British singer/songwriter Kate Bush. The song describes Reich's arrest and incarceration through the eyes of his son, Peter, who later wrote the memoir A Book of Dreams (1973). A cloudbuster, bearing only a superficial resemblance to the genuine article, was designed and built for the video. The video, intended by Bush to be a short narrative film rather than a traditional music video, was conceived by Terry Gilliam and Kate Bush, and directed by Julian Doyle. The video stars actor Donald Sutherland as Reich and Bush as his son, Peter.

Some chemtrail conspiracy theory believers have built cloudbusters, which are then pointed at the sky in an attempt to clear it of chemtrails.

== See also ==
- Climate engineering
- Cloud seeding - a process for dispersing substances into existing clouds to affect precipitation patterns
- Negative air ionization therapy
- Rainmaking
