= Four-beat Rhythm: The Writings of Wilhelm Reich =

Compilation album
- Released: November 27, 2013
- Genre: Rock 'n' roll
- Length: 50:49
- Label: Kreiselwelle Music / Workshop

Four-beat Rhythm: The Writings of Wilhelm Reich (2013) is a compilation album published by Kreiselwelle Music / Workshop on which the writings of Wilhelm Reich are adapted to music. The album is an awareness-raising endeavor for Wilhelm Reich and his works and a fund-raising endeavor for The Wilhelm Reich Infant Trust. This non-profit entity was established by Wilhelm Reich and charged with 1) operating Orgonon as the Wilhelm Reich Museum, 2) protecting, preserving and transmitting Wilhelm Reich's scientific legacy to future generations, 3) safeguarding Wilhelm Reich's Archives and 4) helping infants, children and adolescents.

== Artwork ==
The album cover is an original collage painting by Antony Zito. Zito is known for painting portraits on the streets of the Lower East Side of New York City.

== Track listing ==
All tracks written by Wilhelm Reich.

1. Untitled I: Love, Work and Knowledge... — Benoît Pioulard
2. Song of Youth — Lines of Flight
3. The Sucker — Tim Fite
4. Lonesome — Brother JT
5. Thoughts of Import — Essra Mohawk
6. Once Upon a Time — Grace Sings Sludge
7. Prayer — Lines of Flight
8. Untitled II: Our Love-Life... — Salamander Wool
9. Lied der Jugend — Tocotronic
10. Untitled III: I Have Planted... — The Howling Hex
