= The Mass Psychology of Fascism =

1933 book by Wilhelm Reich

- Cover of the German edition
- Author: Wilhelm Reich
- Original title: Die Massenpsychologie des Faschismus
- Language: German
- Subject: Fascism, authoritarianism, ideologically-oriented sexual repression
- Publisher: Farrar, Straus and Giroux
- Publication date: September 1933
- English publication date: 1946 (translation based on the third, enlarged edition from August 1942)
- Media type: Print
- ISBN: 978-0-374-50884-5
- OCLC: 411193197

The Mass Psychology of Fascism (German: Die Massenpsychologie des Faschismus) is a 1933 psychology book written by the Austrian psychoanalyst and psychiatrist Wilhelm Reich, in which the author attempts to explain how fascists and authoritarians come into power through their political and ideologically-oriented sexual repression on the popular masses.

== Background ==
Reich – originally from Galicia in the Austro-Hungarian Empire and practicing psychoanalysis and psychiatry in Vienna – joined the Social Democratic Party of Austria (SDAP) in 1928. He joined the Communist Party of Germany (KPD) upon moving his psychoanalytic practice to Berlin in 1930. However, The Mass Psychology of Fascism was seen as being so critical of the communist regime in the Soviet Union that Reich was considered to be a liability to the KPD, and was subsequently kicked out of the party upon the book's publication in 1933.

== Summary ==
The question at the heart of Reich's book was this: why did the masses turn to one form of authoritarianism over another. In 1933, Reich set out to analyze "the economic and ideological structure of (particularly) German society between 1928 and 1933" in this book. The healthy alternative, he proposes, is a form of "Workers Democracy", whereby those who 'do' the actual work make the decisions as to what, how and why.

Reich argued that the reason why German fascism (i.e., Nazism) was chosen over communism was that of increased sexual repression in Germany – as opposed to the somewhat more liberal (post-revolutionary) Russia. As children, Reich believed that members of the (German) proletariat learned from their parents to suppress nearly all sexual desire and – instead – expend the repressed energy into authoritarian idealism. Hence, in adults, any rebellious and sexual impulses experienced would cause fundamental anxiety and – therefore, instead – social control is used to reduce anxiety. Fear of revolt, as well as fear of sexuality, were thus "anchored" in the 'character structure' of the masses (the majority). This influenced the 'people' and allowed (what Reich thought as irrational) 'populistic' ideology to flourish, Reich argued:

Reich argued for sexualization of children via what he believed to be the Suppression of the natural sexuality in the child, particularly of its genital sexuality, makes the child apprehensive, shy, obedient, afraid of authority, good and adjusted in the authoritarian sense; it paralyzes the rebellious forces because any rebellion is laden with anxiety; it produces, by inhibiting sexual curiosity and sexual thinking in the child, a general inhibition of thinking and of critical faculties. In brief, the goal of sexual suppression is that of producing an individual who is adjusted to the authoritarian order and who will submit to it in spite of all misery and degradation. Initially, the child has to submit to the structure of the authoritarian miniature state, the family, which process makes it capable of later subordination to the general authoritarian system. The formation of the authoritarian structure takes place through the anchoring of sexual inhibition and anxiety.

Reich believed that the symbolism of the swastika, evoking the fantasy of the primal scene, showed in spectacular fashion how Nazism systematically manipulated the collective unconscious. A repressive family, a baneful religion, a sadistic educational system, the terrorism of the party, fear of economic manipulation, fear of racial contamination, and permitted violence against minorities all operated in and through individuals' (the collective) unconscious psychology of emotions, traumatic experiences, fantasies, libidinal economies, and so on, and Nazi political ideology and practice exacerbated and exploited these tendencies.

For Reich, fighting fascism meant studying it scientifically, which was to say, using the methods of psychoanalysis. He believed that reason alone would be able to check the forces of his own projected irrationality, and loosen the grip of mysticism and is also capable of playing its own part in developing original modes of political action, building on a deep respect for life, and promoting a harmonious channelling of libido and orgastic potency. Reich proposed "work democracy", a self-managing form of social organization that would preserve the individual's freedom, independence, autonomy and encourage his/her responsibility and society would thus base itself on these principles:

Love, work and knowledge are the well-springs of our life. They should also govern it.

== Banning ==
The book, along with many others banned by the Nazis when they came to power, was publicly burnt in the Nazi book burnings. Reich realized he was in considerable danger and hurriedly left Germany; first going to Austria (to see his ex-wife and children) and then to 'exile' in Denmark, Sweden and subsequently Norway. Reich was also subsequently expelled from the International Psychoanalytical Association in 1934 for his political militancy and his views on sexuality. (Note: According to his daughter Lore. The British psychoanalyst Ernest Jones was probably the chief protagonist behind his expulsion and, even though Anna Freud allowed it, she later regretted this.) This book – and all of Reich's published books – were later ordered to be burned on the request of the Food and Drug Administration by a judge in Maine, United States in 1954.

== Family as cell of fascism ==
Chapter V contains the famous statement that the family is the first cell of the fascist society:

From the standpoint of social development, the family cannot be considered the basis of the authoritarian state, only as one of the most important institutions which support it. It is, however, its central reactionary germ cell, the most important place of reproduction of the reactionary and conservative individual. Being itself caused by the authoritarian system, the family becomes the most important institution for its conservation. In this connection, the findings of Morgan and of Engels are still entirely correct.

Gilles Deleuze and Félix Guattari reprised Reich arguments in their joint work Anti-Oedipus (1972), in which they discuss the formation of fascism at the molecular level of society.

== See also ==
- Psychoanalytic sociology
- Right-wing authoritarian personality
- The Authoritarian Personality
- The True Believer
