= Theodor Thjøtta =

Norwegian physician

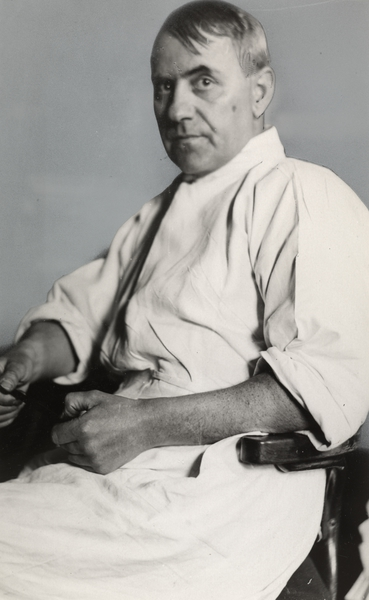
Theodor Thjøtta, c. 1938

Theodor Thjøtta (17 June 1885 – 16 June 1955) was a Norwegian physician. He specialized in bacteriology and serology, and was a professor at the University of Oslo from 1935 to his death.

== Personal life ==
He was born in Sandnes as a son of shoemaker Abraham Thjøtta (1857–) and Rakel Tjølsen (1847–1925). In 1921 he married watchmaker's daughter Alfhild Helene Michelet (1885–1966).

== Career ==
He finished his secondary education in 1907, and graduated with the cand.med. degree from the Royal Frederick University in 1912. After two years as a physician for a whaling expedition from 1913 to 1915, he was hired at the Gade Institute in Bergen in 1915, becoming reserve physician at Bergen Hospital in 1917. In 1918 he took the dr.med. degree on the thesis Dysenteri i Norge (Dysentery in Norway).

From 1919 he was the manager of the Norwegian Army Bacteriological Laboratory, but he got a leave to work as assistant at the Rockefeller Institute from 1920 to 1921. From 1921 to 1925 he was a research fellow at the Royal Frederick University in bacteriology and serology. From 1935 he was a professor at the university (from 1939: the University of Oslo).

He studied a range of topics including dysentery, Spirochaetes, diphtheria, spotted fever, Streptococci and Penicillin. He wrote the textbooks Lærebok i Bakteriologi I—III, and was a member of the editorial boards of Nordisk Hygienisk Tidsskrift and Nordisk Medicinsk Tidsskrift. He was also involved in the criticism of Wilhelm Reich. He was also a board member of the Nansen Foundation from 1935 to 1947.

He was a fellow of the Norwegian Academy of Science and Letters from 1928, fellow of the Swedish Society of Medicine and the Medical Society of Copenhagen and from 1937 a corresponding fellow of the Society of American Bacteriologists. In 1955 he was decorated as a Commander of the Order of St. Olav. He died in the same year, one day before his seventieth birthday.
