= Yuzhynets =

Village in Chernivtsi Oblast, Ukraine

Yuzhynets' Южинець
- Interactive map of Yuzhynets'
- Location in Chernivtsi Oblast Location in Ukraine
- Coordinates: 48°32′10″N 25°39′31″E
- Country: Ukraine
- Oblast: Chernivtsi
- Raion: Chernivtsi Raion

Population
  - Total: 1,128
- Time zone: UTC+2 (EET)
  - Summer (DST): UTC+3 (EEST)
- Postal code: 59313
- Area code: +380 3736

Yuzhynets', also known as Jujinetz, Juźynetz, Iujineț, Jujenet, Juzynci, Juzynetz, Jużyńce, Yuzhenitse or Yuzhenitsy (Ukrainian: Южинець), is a village in Chernivtsi Raion, in Chernivtsi Oblast, Ukraine. It belongs to Stavchany rural hromada, one of the hromadas of Ukraine.

Until 18 July 2020, Yuzhynets belonged to Kitsman Raion. The raion was abolished in July 2020 as part of the administrative reform of Ukraine, which reduced the number of raions of Chernivtsi Oblast to three. The area of Kitsman Raion was split between Chernivtsi Raion and Vyzhnytsia Raion, with Yuzhynets being transferred to Chernivtsi Raion.

== Notable people ==
- Wilhelm Reich (1897-1957), psychoanalyst, lived there from the late 1890s (or early 1900s) till 1915, in the farm of his father, Leon Reich.
