= Die Sexualität im Kulturkampf =

1936 book by Wilhelm Reich

The Sexual Revolution
- Author: Wilhelm Reich
- Original title: Die Sexualität im Kulturkampf
- Language: German
- Subject: Sexual ethics
- Publisher: Sexpol-Verlag
- Publication date: 1936
- Publication place: Denmark
- Pages: 247 pp.
- OCLC: 2391549

Die Sexualität im Kulturkampf ("Sexuality in the Cultural Struggle"), 1936 (published later in English as The Sexual Revolution), is a work by Wilhelm Reich. The subtitle is "zur sozialistischen Umstrukturierung des Menschen" ("for the socialist restructuring of humans"), the double title reflecting the two-part structure of the work.

The first part "analyzes the crisis of the bourgeois sexual morality" and the failure of the attempts of "sexual reform" that preserved the frame of capitalist society (marriage and family). The second part reconstructs the history of the sexual revolution that took place with the establishment of the Soviet Union since 1922, and which was opposed by Joseph Stalin in the late 1920s.

== Significant differences among editions ==
Starting with the 1945 English edition, the following German, French and Italian editions had an unexplained change in the title: The Sexual Revolution. Such title changed "not only the perspective, but also the methodology", resulting in a misleading presentation of the actual work contained in the book. More instructive is the change of the subtitle: from for the socialist restructuring of humans to toward a self-governing character structure.

The editions since 1945, also had a number of "reshuffles, terminology changes and abuses by editors", some of which were intended to "disguise the communist-revolutionary orientation", to avoid hurting the susceptible American public. There are also crucial omissions and changes to the content; while the original edition (1936), based its theory on the "rejection of the family institution as such", the softened versions reject just the "authoritarian family structure", aiming to replace it with a "better and more natural form of family". Other omissions or changes affected the "terms regarding religion, class society, radical left politics, the 'bourgeois' attribute referred to family, morality or sexuality, proletariat, etc.

In 1992, Italian publisher Erre Emme, published for the first time not only an integral 1936 edition, but also integrations showing the changes of the 1945 edition, in order to allow a scientific confrontation.

== Content ==
"We are living through a true revolution of all values regarding sexual life. And among those values most seriously undermined are those relating to infant and adolescent sexuality."

— Wilhelm Reich

In Part I, Reich explains that sexual neuroses derive from the lack of gratification of natural sexuality. Natural sexuality is left unsatisfied and thereby creates neuroses due to suppression of this sexuality by the authoritarian state. For Reich, this state is characterized best by the capitalist state that is based on the unit of the patriarchical family, within which the father mirrors the state as the absolute authority.

According to Reich, the authoritarian state uses a variety of tools in order to suppress its citizens' natural sexualities. These tools comprise Reich's view of "conservative, sex-negative moralism" and include:

1. the ideology of lifelong, monogamous marriage, which Reich calls "compulsive marriage";
2. the suppression of infantile sexuality, which Reich cites as the primary cause of unnatural sexual desires and perversions later in life;
3. a lack of candid sexual education or sexual freedom for adolescents;
4. the persecution of abnormal sexualities such as homosexuality;
5. the illegality of abortion;
6. marriage as a legalized institution, and the lack of an "incompatibility" reason for divorce.

These various means of suppression in turn cause the authoritarian state's citizens to both repress their natural sexual desires and create new, neurotic, unhealthy sexual desires. Reich explains that this relationship between suppression/repression of natural sexuality and the creation or intensification of sexual neuroses is a cyclical relationship that constantly results in more power for the authoritarian state.

The authoritarian state's motive, whether it is conscious of it or not, is to preserve its economic structure through continuance of the patriarchal family as its primary social unit. The family, according to Reich, is essential to the economic structure of capitalism because it benefits the capitalist as well as preserves itself to the next generation. The latter is achieved through suppression of infantile sexual attraction to the parents, thereby producing a repressed attachment to the family unit. The child longs for familial relationships and mimics the parent of its own gender in the creation of its own family. The capitalist benefits from the economic unit of the family because of the husband's economic dominance over the wife, who is economically dependent on her husband and works for no wage in the house. This allows the employer of the husband to pay him a lesser wage because the employer need not take into account the cost that the husband would have to pay a housekeeper or childcare provider. This lack of extra wage for traditional female housework and child-rearing encourages the woman to stay home to be economical, as well as allows her husband's employer to keep that extra surplus capital for himself. The husband also benefits because he is given power and authority in the home that he does not necessarily get in the workplace.

In the preface of the 1945 edition, Reich says that "our" (Western) family structure is inherited from old patriarchy.

Fraenkel (1992) notes that the supposed "sexual revolution" claimed for the West since the late 60s is indeed a misconception. Sex is not actually enjoyed freely, it is just observed in all the fields of culture. In order to move from that to an actual sexual liberation, we must change our mental structures and our moral inhibitions. Instead, the repressive Judeo-Christian morals still basically hold, and small social changes are exaggerated because they're seen in that light. Even many supposed atheists have just secularized and internalized the same old morals.

The bourgeois ideology has a strong demand that adolescents, having reached sexual maturity, be repressed in sexual abstinence. To justify this sad privation, which is the basis of their unhappiness, all sorts of unscientific and ridiculous justifications have been made up. This doesn't happen, anthropological cross-cultural studies have shown, in many contemporary societies which don't have a marked patriarchal ideology (an ideology pushed by the bias of technologies like intensive agriculture and mechanization, and which are therefore controversially termed "primitive" by westerns). Anthropologists who have studied such people include Bronisław Malinowski, with his 1929 work The Sexual Life of Savages in North-Western Melanesia, Ploss-Bartels (de), Havelock Ellis, Hans Meyer on the Wahehe and Wossangu.

There is an active effort to obstruct pubescent people from starting to engage in sexual activity. This includes keeping them from finding the information they need to understand their sexual issues. So-called "sex education" is practically always a work of deception which focuses on biology while concealing excitement-arousal, which is what interests them the most, and hides the fact that all their worries and difficulties originate from unsatisfied sexual impulses.
