= Myron Sharaf =

American medical academic

- Born: July 7, 1926; Miami, Florida, U.S.
- Died: May 13, 1997 (aged 70); Berlin, Germany
- Education: Harvard College (B.A., 1949); Tufts University (M.Ed., 1953); Harvard University (Ph.D., 1960)
- Occupation: Psychotherapist
- Employers: Harvard Medical School; Boston State Hospital; Tufts University School of Medicine
- Notable work: Fury on Earth: A Biography of Wilhelm Reich (1983)

Myron Russcol Sharaf (July 7, 1926 – May 13, 1997) was an American writer and psychotherapist. He was a lecturer in psychiatry at Harvard Medical School, the director of the Center for Sociopsychological Research and Education at Boston State Hospital, and assistant clinical professor of psychology in the Department of Psychiatry at Tufts University School of Medicine.

Sharaf was a student, patient, and colleague of Wilhelm Reich's from 1948 to 1954, and the author of what is widely regarded as the definitive biography of Reich, Fury On Earth (1983). He died of a heart attack in Berlin in 1997, after addressing a conference in Vienna marking Reich's centennial.

== Early life and education ==
Sharaf was born in Miami, but grew up in Brookline, Massachusetts, the son of Nathan Sharaf and Anne Russcol Sharaf. His father founded the Steaming Kettle Coffee Shop chain. His paternal great-grandparents, originally named "Sharafsky", were Jewish emigrants from the Russian Empire. He obtained his first degree in psychology from Harvard College in 1949, an M.Ed. from Tufts University in 1953, and a Ph.D. in psychology and education from Harvard University in 1960.

== Fury on Earth ==
A New York Times review of Fury on Earth: A Biography of Wilhelm Reich describes Sharaf as "intimate for more than 10 years as student, disciple, patient and colleague" of Reich. Paul Roazen wrote in The Psychoanalytic Review, "Myron Sharaf's Fury on Earth is far and away the finest book both on Reich's work and his life. It is a work of scholarship that may well, until the Reich Archives are finally opened, remain definitive on the subject."

== Bibliography ==
- An Approach to the Theory and Measurement of Intraception. Harvard University Graduate School of Education. 1959. p. 478 pages.
- with Milton Greenblatt. Dynamics of Program Development. Harvard University Graduate School of Education. 1971. p. 123 pages.
- with Milton Greenblatt and Evelyn M. Stone. Dynamics of Institutional Change: The Hospital in Transition (reprint ed.). Beard Books. 2003. p. 292 pages. ISBN 1-58798-181-5.
- Fury on Earth: A Biography of Wilhelm Reich. St Martin's Press/Marek. 1983. p. 550 pages. ISBN 0-312-31370-5.

== See also ==
- Life Against Death
