= Leiv Kreyberg =

Norwegian pathologist

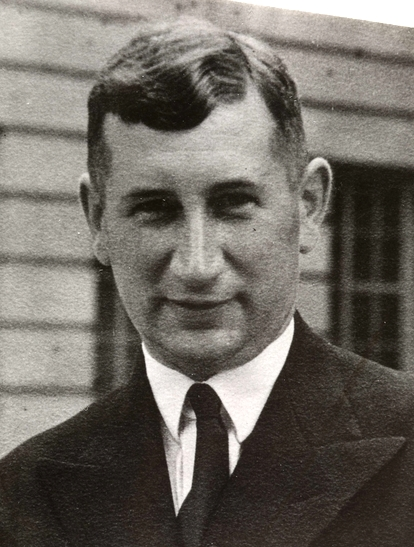
Leiv Kreyberg, c. 1933

Leiv Kreyberg (22 May 1896 – 6 September 1984) was a Norwegian pathologist. He was a professor at the University of Oslo from 1938 to 1964. Among his scientific studies was the development and typology of lung cancer. During World War II he contributed to the organizing of the Norwegian Army's medical service, and he participated in the repatriation of prisoners of war in Northern Norway.
