= Christopher Turner (writer) =

British writer

- Education: MA, anthropology, archaeology and art history, University of Cambridge; PhD (2000), humanities and cultural studies, London Consortium
- Occupation: Writer

Christopher Turner is a British writer. He has been a regular contributor to Cabinet magazine since 2004, and to the London Review of Books since 2001. He has also written for The Guardian and The Sunday Telegraph, and is the editor of Icon magazine.

Turner is the author of Adventures in the Orgasmatron: Wilhelm Reich and the Invention of Sex (2011), which was long-listed for the Orwell Prize.

== Background ==
Turner obtained an MA in anthropology, archaeology and art history from the University of Cambridge, and his PhD in 2000 in humanities and cultural studies from the London Consortium, with a thesis entitled "The Disgusting: The Unrepresentable from Kant to Kristeva." He was a visiting scholar at Columbia University from 2003 to 2004.

== Works ==
- Adventures in the Orgasmatron: Wilhelm Reich and the Invention of Sex. Fourth Estate (UK), 2011. Published in the US as Adventures in the Orgasmatron: How the Sexual Revolution Came to America, Farrar, Straus and Giroux, 2011.
