= Orgonon =

Biographical museum in Rangeley, Maine

Coordinates: 44°59′05″N 70°42′58″W

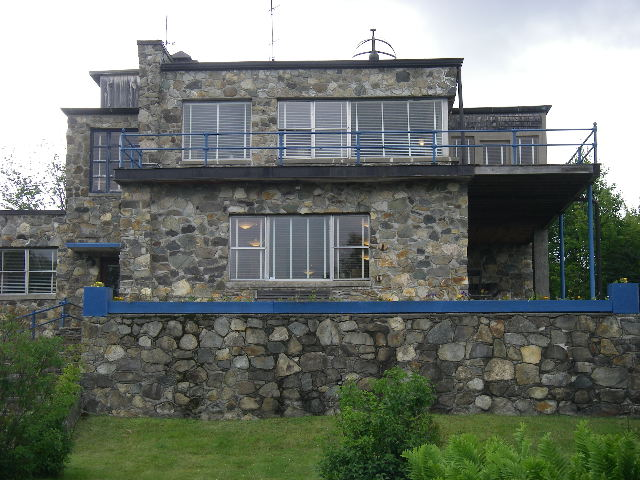
The Reich Museum

Orgonon was the 175-acre (71 ha) home, laboratory and research center of the Austrian-born psychiatrist Wilhelm Reich (1897–1957). Located in Rangeley, Maine, it is Reich's burial place, and is open to the public as the Wilhelm Reich Museum. Its main building, designed by James B. Bell and built for Reich in 1948, is listed on the National Register of Historic Places (as the Orgone Research Laboratory), and is a significant example of International Style architecture in the state. The name is derived from the hypostatized term "orgone", Reich's principal area of study in his later years.

== Facilities ==
The Orgonon campus is set on about 175 acres (71 ha) of land west of the town center of Rangeley and north of Rangeley Lake, roughly midway between Rangeley and the village of Oquossoc. The property includes two major buildings and two cabins.

=== Orgone Energy Observatory ===
The main building is the Orgone Energy Observatory, and is where Reich did his research and had his office and library. It is a fieldstone structure, two stories high, with a flat roof. The International Style building was designed by New York City architect James B. Bell and completed in 1948. The roughly centered entry leads into a hallway, with Reich's laboratory on the right and a suite of rooms on the left that included a kitchen, bathrooms, and playroom for Reich's son. The upper level, accessed by stairs at the back of the hall, included a bathroom, office, and living quarters. The walls are finished in knotty pine throughout, with plywood ceilings and vinyl flooring.

=== Conference center ===
The conference center is an L-shaped wood-frame structure, built in 1945 and designated by Reich as the Students' Laboratory. It has been adapted for use by the museum to house its offices and meeting space.

=== Cabins ===
The property includes one cabin, which is seasonally available for rental. The cabin, named "Tamarack," has three bedrooms with a full kitchen, and is in a secluded setting somewhat apart from the main buildings. Tamarack was used by the immediate Reich Family as a residence, and the doctor stipulated that it should be made available to needy children. The trust managing the property donates use of this cabin for four weeks every summer to needy families.

== See also ==
- National Register of Historic Places listings in Franklin County, Maine
