= Ludwika Karpińska =

Polish psychologist & scholar

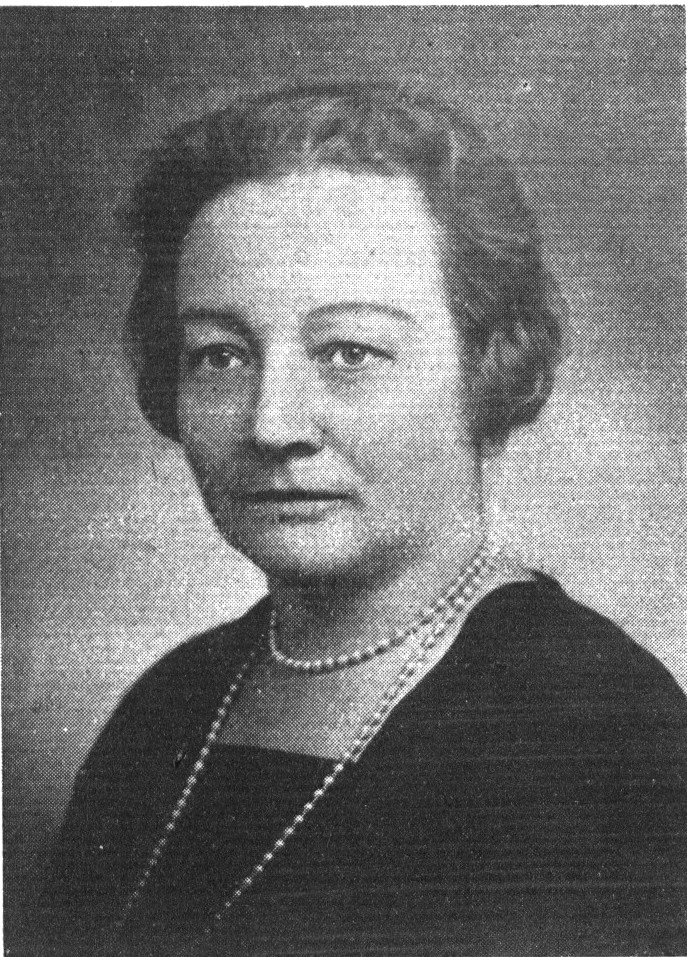
Ludwika Karpińska

Ludwika Karpińska or Karpińska-Woyczyńska (25/30 August 1872 – 30 January 1937) was a Polish psychologist and translator who has been described as "a forgotten forerunner of Polish psychoanalysis".

== Life ==
Ludwika Karpińska was born on 25 August 1872 in Warsaw (according to curriculum vitae which she wrote herself) or on 30 August 1872 in Płock (according to her birth certificate). She became a home tutor while acquiring education at the Flying University, the secret school for women's higher education on the periphery of the University of Warsaw. She is likely to have attended Adam Mahrburg's lectures in the 1890s. From 1897 to 1899 she studied at the University of Berlin. Financial considerations forced her to return to Warsaw and work as a home tutor again from 1897 to 1807: she translated works by Richard Avenarius and Ferdinand Tönnies into Polish. From 1907 to 1909 she studied at the University of Zurich, encountering the work of Eugen Bleuler and Carl Jung. She gained a doctorate under Friedrich Schumann with a thesis on stereoscopic vision, 'Experimental Contributions to Analysis of Depth Vision'.

Returning to Warsaw, Karpińska defended Freudian psychoanalysis at the first Congress of Polish Neurologists, Psychiatrists and Psychologists, where a presentation by Ludwig Jekels provoked "violent debate". In 1909-10 she and Jekels attended four gatherings of the Vienna Psychoanalytic Society: her criticisms of the society's ignorance of philosophy caused Freud to refer to her as a "Polish lady philosopher". Karpińska herself underwent psychoanalysis with an unknown German psychoanalyst.

After continuing to support herself as a home tutor in Warsaw, she relocated to Zakopane in 1911, possibly for health reasons. During the war she joined the Polish Legions as a nurse. She married Marcin Wyczynski, a doctor specializing in pulmonary disease.

In May 1920 Ludwika Karpińska-Woyczyńska became director of the Municipal Psychological Lab in Łódź, where she worked on the psychological testing of children and young people.

Her husband became personal physician to Józef Piłsudski, and the couple accompanied him on a 1931 holiday trip to Egypt. However in 1935 Piłsudski became suspicious that Karpińska-Woyczyńska was a Communist spy, and had her arrested and interrogated for several weeks at Pawiak prison. No evidence was found. She died on 30 January 1937 in Warsaw.

== Works ==
=== Books ===
- (tr. with Aniela Karpińskich) W sprawie filozofji naukowej [On the Matter of Scientific Philosophy], 1902. Translated from the German of Richard Avenarius.
- (tr.) Tomasz Hobbes życie jego i nauka [Thomas Hobbes: His Life and Learning], 1903. Translated from the German of Ferdinand Tönnies.
- Badanie dzieci umysłowo niedorozwiniętych ze szkół powszechnych [Examination of mentally underdeveloped primary school children], 1921.

=== Articles ===
- 'O psychoanalizie', Ruch Filoz Vol. 4, No. 2 (1914), pp. 32–38.
- 'Ein Beitrag zur Analyse „sinnloser“ Worte im Traume', Internationale Zeitschrift für ärztliche Psychoanalyse, Vol. 2. No. 2 (1914), pp. 164–170.
- 'Über die psychologischen Grundlagen des Freudismus'. Internationale Zeitschrift für ärztliche Psychoanalyse Vol. 2, No. 4 (1914), pp. 305–326.
