= Bibring =

Bribing is a surname. Notable people with the surname include:

- Edward Bibring (1894–1959), Austrian-American psychoanalyst
- Grete L. Bibring (1899–1977), Austrian-American psychoanalyst and professor, wife of Edward

== See also ==
- Meanings of minor planet names: 18001–19000#113
