= On the Origin of the "Influencing Machine" in Schizophrenia =

1919 article in psychoanalysis

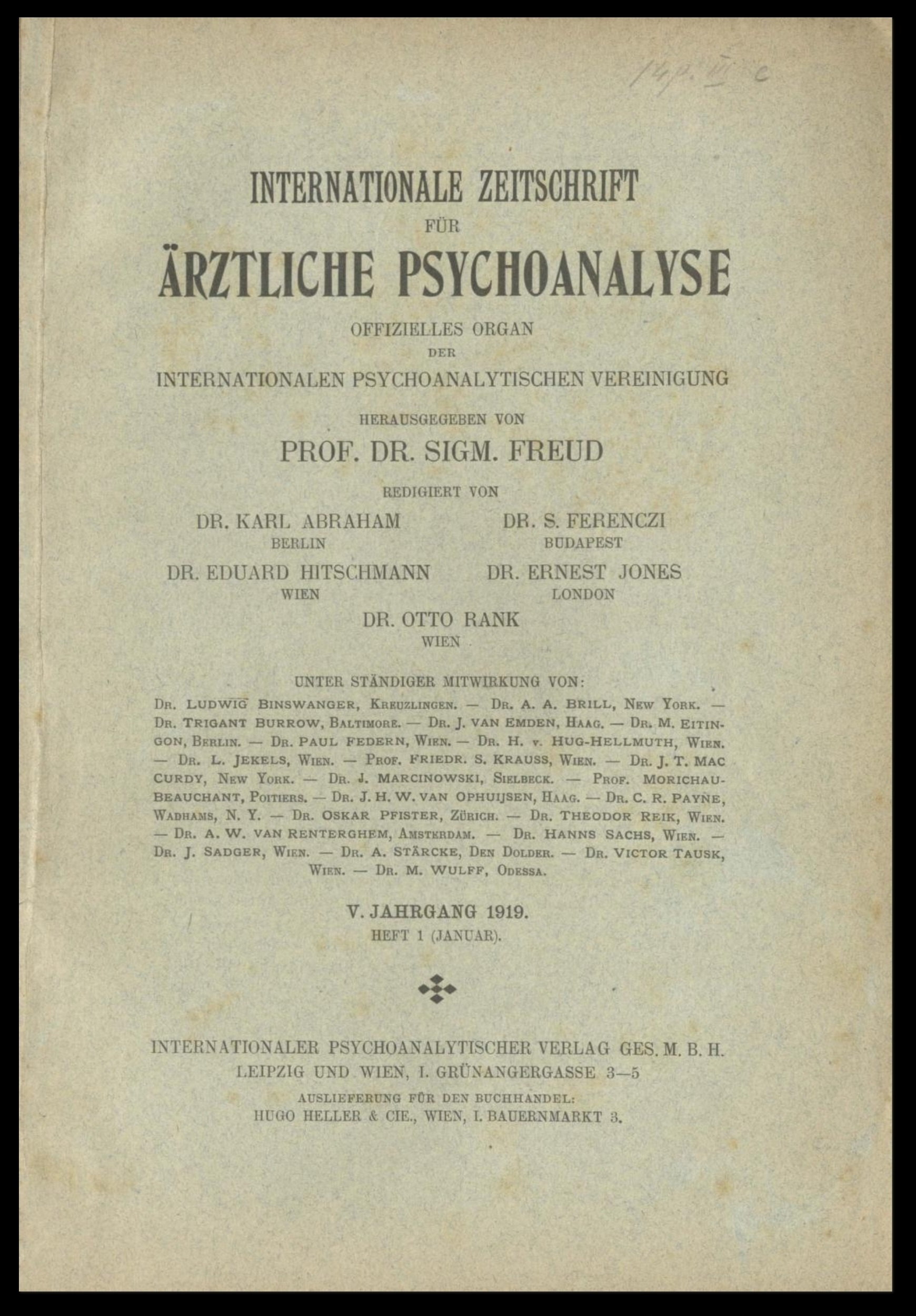
The January 1919 issue of Internationale Zeitschrift für Psychoanalyse, in which Tausk's article on the influencing machine was first published

"On the Origin of the 'Influencing Machine' in Schizophrenia" (German: Über die Entstehung des „Beeinflussungsapparates“ in der Schizophrenie) is an article written by Austrian psychoanalyst Victor Tausk. He read it to and discussed it with the Vienna Psychoanalytic Society in January 1918. It was first published in 1919 in the German-language journal Internationale Zeitschrift für Psychoanalyse and, after translation into English by Dorian Feigenbaum, in The Psychoanalytic Quarterly in 1933.

The article describes Tausk's observations and interpretations of several persecutory delusions that plagued some of his patients who had been diagnosed with schizophrenia. They believed their thoughts and bodily sensations were controlled by a machine that defied their technical comprehension and secretly influenced them from a distance, often claiming that it was operated by a group of people who were persecuting them. The accused users of the machine were almost always males and, in many of the cases Tausk witnessed, physicians who had treated the patients.

The paper has become a classic in the psychological understanding of schizophrenia and, according to consensus among today's psychiatrists, remains Tausk's most enduring contribution to the study of mental illnesses.

== Presentation ==
For schizophrenic patients, the boundaries between the self and the exterior world, or between the self as subject and object, are blurred; the patients may feel that their experience of the subjective self is reduced to the extent that they are completely under the control of an external force. According to Tausk, the loss of ego boundaries in schizophrenia is accompanied by a regression to pregenital narcissistic states, in which the child could not yet distinguish between the self and the exterior world and believed that their parents or God knew all their thoughts.

Tausk observes the gradual transformation of an influencing machine in a young female patient's delusions: Initially manifest in the exact form of her own body, the influencing machine became increasingly mechanical until it lost any resemblance to her physique. He concludes that influencing machines are always a projection of the patient's own body onto the exterior world and that the libido motivating the projection has regressed to an infantile pregenital stage.

The patients often show a remarkable interest in learning about current technology so that they can explain the operation of the influencing machine. Yet, even with the benefit of this understanding, the machine always has a mystical quality beyond explanation. Its described effects include:

- Causing the patient to see two-dimensional images as if projected onto their surroundings
- Creating and removing thoughts in the patient's mind by means of waves or rays
- Producing odd sensations and physiological changes in the body, with particular attention to the sex organs, through electricity, magnetism or other action at a distance.

The patient imagines the machine's presence only after a psychotic experience has occurred. The delusion therefore fulfills the patient's need for a causal explanation of otherwise inexplicable events, and indicates that schizophrenia is in an advanced stage of development.

== Notable cases ==
The best-known example of an influencing machine is that of James Tilly Matthews who believed he was being controlled by a device called the "Air Loom." Matthews was a tea merchant and political activist before he was admitted to the Bethlem Royal Hospital after shouting "treason" in the British House of Commons in 1797. He was a prolific writer and artist and described the "air loom" in great detail. His descriptions were published as a book in 1810 by John Haslam entitled Illustrations of Madness.

== In art and media ==
=== Literature ===
In the novel One Flew Over the Cuckoo's Nest, the narrator, "Chief" Bromden, believes that the psychiatric ward in which he is committed (including the staff) is a machine in the service of a broader "Combine" – his name for technological society. This portrayal has been described as one of the best-known fictional examples of an "influencing machine" patient.

Activist Jerry Mander's book Four Arguments for the Elimination of Television argues for the complete removal of television from human lives because of its alleged ill effects. Mander gives the example of Tausk's "Influencing machine" as being a parallel for television: "Doubtless you have noticed that this 'influencing machine' sounds an awful lot like television ... In any event, there is no question that television does what the schizophrenic fantasy says it does. It places in our minds images of reality which are outside our experience. The pictures come in the form of rays from a box. They cause changes in feeling and ... utter confusion as to what is real and what is not."

== See also ==
- Daniel Paul Schreber – German judge (1842 – 1911)
- Thought broadcasting – Delusion that others can hear one's thoughts
- Thought insertion – Delusional belief that thoughts have been inserted into one's mind
- Tin foil hat – Hat and stereotype for conspiracy theorists
