= Abreaction =

Psychoanalytical term

Abreaction (German: Abreagieren) is a psychoanalytical term for reliving an experience to purge it of its emotional excesses—a type of catharsis. Sometimes it is a method of becoming conscious of repressed traumatic events.

== Psychoanalytic origins ==
The concept of abreaction may have been initially formulated by Freud's mentor, Josef Breuer; but it was in their joint work of 1895, Studies on Hysteria, that it was first made public to denote the idea that pent-up emotions associated with a trauma could be discharged by talking about it. The release of strangulated affect by bringing a particular moment or problem into conscious focus, and thereby abreacting the stifled emotion attached to it, formed the cornerstone of Freud's early cathartic method of treating hysterical conversion symptoms. For instance, they believed that pent-up emotions associated with trauma can be discharged by talking about it.

Freud and Breur, however, did not treat the spontaneous emotional reliving of traumatic events as curative. They instead described abreaction as the full emotional and motoric response to a traumatic event necessary in adequately relieving a person of being repetitively and unpredictably assailed by the trauma's original and unmitigated emotional intensity. Although the element of surprise is not compatible with Freud's approach to therapy, other theorists consider that, in abreaction, it is an important part of analytic technique.

Early in his career, psychoanalyst Carl Jung expressed interest in abreaction, or what he referred to as trauma theory, but later decided it had limitations in treatment of neurosis. Jung said:

Though traumata of clearly aetiological significance were occasionally present, the majority of them appeared very improbable. Many traumata were so unimportant, even so normal, that they could be regarded at most as a pretext for the neurosis. But what especially aroused my criticism was the fact that not a few traumata were simply inventions of fantasy and had never happened at all.

== Later developments ==
Mainstream psychoanalysis tended over time (with Freud) to downplay the role of abreaction, in favor of the working through of the emotions revealed through such acting-out of the past. However, Otto Rank explored abreaction of birth trauma as a central part of his revision of Freudian theory; while Edward Bibring revived the notion of abreaction as emotional reliving, a theme subsequently taken up by Vamik Volkan in his re-grief therapy.

== In Scientology ==
In Scientology, Dianetics is a form of abreaction that science fiction writer L. Ron Hubbard borrowed from the United States Navy when he spent three months in a San Diego hospital in 1943 with the complaints of an ulcer and malaria. Hubbard later wrote, in his autobiography My Philosophy, that he had observed abreactive therapy in the hospital, though in later life he claimed to have made the discovery on his own after being wounded in battle and given up as untreatable.

== See also ==
- Breaking point (psychology)
- Primal therapy
- Recovered memory therapy
- Regression (psychology)
- Working through
