= Edward Bibring =

Austrian American psychoanalyst (1894–1959)

Edward Bibring (20 April 1894, Stanislau, Austria-Hungary – 11 January 1959, Boston) was an Austrian-born American psychoanalyst. He studied philosophy and history at the University of Czernowitz until World War I. After his military service, he went to study medicine at the University of Vienna, and later was accepted for training by the Vienna Psychoanalytic Society, in which he became an associate member from 1925, and then a full member in 1927. He was closely associated with Sigmund Freud. He was a co-editor of the Internationale Zeitschrift für Psychoanalyse for a brief period. In 1921, he married his fellow analyst Grete L. Bibring, and in 1941 the pair emigrated to the US.

== Writings ==
His publications focus on scientific contributions to the theory of psychoanalytic therapy, the study of depression, and the history of psychoanalysis.

Bibring's early writings included studies of the instincts and of the repetition compulsion. He also wrote a pair of articles on paranoia in schizophrenia, including a case study of a woman who believed herself to be persecuted by someone called "Behind", a figure onto whom she had projected aspects of her own rear.

Ernest Jones reported with approval Bibring's measured disagreement with Freud's concept of the death drive: "Instincts of life and death are not psychologically perceptible as such; they are biological instincts whose existence is required by hypothesis alone & ought only to be adduced in a theoretical context and not in discussion of a clinical or empirical nature".

While struggling with writer's block in the States, Bibring did publish a 1954 article on the role of abreaction in what he called "emotional reliving" – a theme later developed by Vamik Volkan in his re-grief therapy.

== See also ==
- Ernst Kris
- Erik H. Erikson
- Wilhelm Reich
