= WPV =

WPV may refer to:

- Vienna Psychoanalytic Society (German: Wiener Psychoanalytische Vereinigung; 1902–1938)
- Wild poliovirus, the cause of the polio disease
- Workplace violence, in health and safety
