= Helene Deutsch =

American psychoanalyst (1884–1982)

- Biography of Deutsch
- Born: Helene Rosenbach; 9 October 1884; Przemyśl, Austrian Galicia, Austria-Hungary
- Died: 29 March 1982 (aged 97); Cambridge, Massachusetts, U.S.
- Education: University of Vienna
- Known for: Psychoanalysis of women
- Scientific career
- Fields: Psychoanalysis
- Workplaces: University of Vienna; Vienna Psychoanalytic Society; Massachusetts General Hospital; Boston Psychoanalytic Society

Helene Deutsch (German: [dɔʏtʃ]; née Helena Rosenbach; 9 October 1884 – 29 March 1982) was a Polish-American psychoanalyst and colleague of Sigmund Freud. She founded the Vienna Psychoanalytic Institute. In 1935, she immigrated to Cambridge, Massachusetts, where she maintained a practice. Deutsch was one of the first psychoanalysts to specialize in women. She was a Fellow of the American Academy of Arts and Sciences.

== Early life and education ==
Helene Deutsch was born in Przemyśl, then in Austrian Galicia, to Jewish parents, Wilhelm and Regina Rosenbach, on 9 October 1884. She was the youngest of four children, with sisters, Malvina, and Gizela and a brother, Emil. Although Deutsch's father had a German education, Helene (Rosenbach) attended private Polish-language schools. In the late eighteenth century, Poland had been partitioned by Russia, Prussia, and Austria; Helene grew up in a time of resurgent Polish nationalism and artistic creativity, Mloda Polska. As a result, Helene empathized with the works of Frédéric Chopin, and Polish literature, insisting on her Polish national identity, out of allegiance to a country that she and her siblings viewed as invaded. During her youth, Helene became involved in the defence of socialist ideals with Herman Lieberman, a Polish politician. Their relations lasted for more than ten years. She went with him to an International Socialist Conference in 1910 and met the majority of key socialist figures, such as the charismatic women Angelica Balabanoff and Rosa Luxemburg.

Deutsch studied medicine and psychiatry in Vienna and Munich. She became a pupil and then assistant to Freud, and became the first woman to concern herself with the psychoanalysis of women. Following a youthful affair with the socialist leader Herman Lieberman, Helene married Dr. Felix Deutsch in 1912, and after a number of miscarriages, gave birth to a son, Martin. In 1935, she fled Germany, immigrating to Cambridge, Massachusetts, in the United States. Helene Deutsch's husband and son joined her a year later, and she worked there as a well-regarded psychoanalyst up until her death in Cambridge in 1982.

== Family ==
=== Father ===
Deutsch often reported that her father was her early source of inspiration. Her father, Wilhelm, was a prominent Jewish lawyer, 'a liberal and a specialist in international law' during a time when anti-Semitism was rampant. He was able to become Galicia's representative at the Federal Court in Vienna, and the first Jew in the region to represent clients in court. Similar to Freud, Wilhelm saw clients in a special room in his home, but he also had a formal office away from home. Helene idolized her father, and often shadowed him throughout his day with clients. Being able to shadow her father led Deutsch to contemplate at one time becoming a lawyer, until she learned that women were excluded from practicing law. This exclusion led her to psychoanalysis, which would become her lifelong career.

Known in Przemyśl as the beautiful Rosenbach daughter, Helene was given the title of most 'brilliant enough to be a son.' It was in early childhood when Helene and her father began to experience tension in their relationship. Spurred by her thirst for education and her disdain for the life her mother planned for her, Helene turned to her father, only to find him unwilling to help her further her education past the age of fourteen. In her work, The Psychology of Women, Deutsch connects one aspect of feminine masochism with her attachment to her father and the possible consequences of such an identification. She writes that a father will sometimes break his relationship with his daughter when she approaches the age of sexual maturity. Deutsch later attributed her father's resistance to his subservience to his wife and desire for peace at home.

=== Mother ===
Deutsch's relationship with her mother Regina was distant and cold. While she adored her father Helene hated her mother and claimed her mother 'shared none of her husband's intellectual interests'. Helene considered her mother's interests to be social and materialistic. Helene claimed her mother was abusive; often beating, slapping, and verbally attacking her. Helene stated that her mother's abuse toward her was 'as an outlet for her own pent-up aggressions' because Helene was not the boy her mother had wanted and expected. Helene often said that her childhood home was dominated by her mother's overwhelming concern for social propriety and status. Helene considered her mother 'uncultured, intellectually insecure, and a slave to bourgeois propriety'. Although Helene at times yearned for the love of her mother, she never received what she desired. Instead, any maternal affection came from her sister, Malvina, and a woman in the neighborhood affectionately called 'the Pale Countess.' During her childhood, Helene recalled being looked after by 'nine different nurses'. She hated feeling dependent on her mother, and these feelings often led her to 'daydream that someone else was her real mother.'

=== Siblings ===
Deutsch's sister, Malvina, was the person from whom she received maternal affection. When their mother decided to beat Helene, Malvina was the one to caution beatings away from the head. Malvina, however, was herself the subject of the limited view of a woman's role in society. Helene Deutsch and her sisters were expected to marry early in life and to marry socially appropriate men. Although a gifted sculptor and painter, Malvina was forced to marry the man chosen by her parents as 'more appropriate,' instead of the man of her dreams.

Deutsch's brother Emil, however, offered abuse rather than affection. Emil sexually abused Helene when she was around four years old, and continued to torment her throughout her childhood. In her later life, Helene saw this affair as the 'root cause of her tendency not only secretly to fantasize, but to relay these fantasies as truth.' As the only son in the family, Emil was supposed to be the heir apparent to the family. Instead, Emil proved to be a gambler, profiteer and poor student, and a disappointment to the family. Throughout her life, Deutsch tried to make up for her brother's shortcomings, but 'felt she never successfully made up for Emil's failure in her mother's eyes,' but did replace him as her father's favorite.

== The "as-if" personality ==
'Her best known clinical concept was that of the "as if" personality, a notion that allowed her to spotlight the origin of women's particular ability to identify with others'. Deutsch singled out schizoid personalities who 'seem normal enough because they have succeeded in substituting "pseudo contacts" of manifold kinds for a real feeling contact with other people; they behave "as if" they had feeling relations with other people ... their ungenuine pseudo emotions'. More broadly, she considered that 'the "generally frigid" person who more or less avoids emotions altogether ... may learn to hide their insufficiencies and to behave "as if" they had real feelings and contact with people'.

It has been suggested that it was 'Helene's tendency to love by identifying herself with the object, then experiencing that love as betrayed and running to the next object ... [that] she herself explored in her various studies on the "as if" personality'. Indeed, Lisa Appignanesi has written that 'her memoir sometimes fills one with the sense that she experienced her own existence to be an "as if" — living her life first "as if" a socialist in her identification with Lieberman; "as if" a conventional wife with Felix; "as if" a mother ... then "as if" a psychoanalyst in the identification with Freud'.

== On women ==
'Helene Deutsch, who was to make her name with her writings on female sexuality' became paradoxically something of an Aunt Sally or straw man 'in feminist circles...her name tarnished with the brush of a "misogynist" Freud whose servile disciple she is purported to be'. In 1925 she 'became the first psychoanalyst to publish a book on the psychology of women'; and according to Paul Roazen, the 'interest she and Karen Horney showed in this subject prompted Freud, who did not like to be left behind, to write a number of articles on women himself'. In his 1931 article on "Female Sexuality", Freud wrote approvingly of 'Helene Deutsch's latest paper, on feminine masochism and its relation to frigidity (1930), in which she also recognises the girl's phallic activity and the intensity of her attachment to her mother'.

In 1944–5, Deutsch published her two-volume work, The Psychology of Women, on the 'psychological development of the female ... Volume 1 deals with girlhood, puberty, and adolescence. Volume 2 deals with motherhood in a variety of aspects, including adoptive mothers, unmarried mothers, and stepmothers'. Mainstream opinion saw the first volume as 'a very sensitive book by an experienced psychoanalyst .. Volume II, Motherhood, is equally valuable'. It was, however, arguably 'Deutsch's eulogy of motherhood which made her so popular ... in the "back-to-the-home" 1950s and unleashed the feminist backlash against her in the next decades' — though she was also seen by the feminists as 'the reactionary apologist of female masochism, echoing a catechism which would make of woman a failed man, a devalued and penis-envying servant of the species'.

As time permits a more nuanced, post-feminist view of Freud, feminism and Deutsch, so too one can appreciate that her central book 'is replete with sensitive insight into the problems women confront at all stages of their lives'. Indeed, it has been claimed of Deutsch that 'the ruling concerns of her life bear a striking resemblance to those of women who participated in the second great wave of feminism in the 1970s: early rebellion ... struggle for independence and education ... conflict between the demands of career and family, ambivalence over motherhood, split between sexual and maternal feminine identities'. In the same way, one may see that 'to cap the parallel, Deutsch's psychoanalytic preoccupations were with the key moments of female sexuality: menstruation, defloration, intercourse, pregnancy, infertility, childbirth, lactation, the mother-child relation, menopause ... the underlying agenda of any contemporary women's magazine – an agenda which her writings helped in some measure to create'.

== On pregnancy ==
In April 1912, Helene married Felix Deutsch. Following the outbreak of World War I, Helene experienced the first of many miscarriages. In The Psychology of Women, Helene discussed the concept of spontaneous abortion and miscarriage as a result of psychological factors, with a critical factor involving the 'pregnant woman's unconscious rejection of an identification with her own mother.' Under the pseudonym of a patient named Mrs. Smith, Helene tells the story of a woman who has trouble bringing a baby to full term. Helene wrote that Mrs. Smith was the youngest child of a large family, where her mother's disappointment that she was not a boy was evident. Mrs. Smith, however, took solace in the deep love of her father and older sister. When she married and wanted to have a child, Mrs. Smith had difficulty reconciling her desire for a child with her mother's rejection of her. When she was about to become a mother herself, Mrs. Smith's fear about identifying with her mother intensified. This fear came to fruition when Mrs. Smith gave birth to a stillborn child one month before full term.

The story of Mrs. Smith is strikingly similar to that of Helene's, as if she, herself, were speaking through Mrs. Smith. Through the story of Mrs. Smith, Helene argues that a successful pregnancy is possible when there is a loving relationship between mother and daughter, which 'smoothly socializes daughters into becoming mothers themselves.' Mirroring the life of Helene, Mrs. Smith's problem is resolved during the next pregnancy when Mrs. Smith identifies with a pregnant friend, and particularly with the friend's mother. Helene wrote that the friend's mother was the opposite of Mrs. Smith's mother. She was filled with maternal warmth for both Mrs. Smith and her own daughter. This maternal love, shared with her friend, allowed Mrs. Smith to become a mother. According to Helene, although a healthy relationship between mother and daughter was important for a healthy pregnancy, equally important was the ability to lean on a female friend who could act as a surrogate sister for the pregnant woman. This idea is furthered when Mrs. Smith and her friend became pregnant again around the same time. This time, there was no anxiety or fear surrounding pregnancy, but when Mrs. Smith's friend moved away, she miscarried. The diagnosis, according to Helene, was that Mrs. Smith suffered from 'over-excitability of the uterus.' A successful pregnancy, therefore, could only be brought about by leaning on another woman.

== Freud and beyond ==
In 1916, Deutsch sought admittance to Freud's infamous Wednesday night meetings of Vienna Psychoanalytic Society. As a condition of her acceptance, Helene had to comment on Lou Andreas-Salomé's paper, 'Vaginal and anal.'

In 1919, under Freud's supervision, Deutsch began analyzing her first patient, Viktor Tausk, while at the same time Freud was analyzing Helene. After three months, upon Freud's request, Deutsch terminated Tausk's sessions. During her sessions with Freud, Deutsch reported 'falling in love with Freud.' She often felt herself to be Freud's daughter, claiming that Freud had inspired and released her talents. Deutsch claimed, however, that Freud tended to focus "too much on her identification with her father" and her affair with Lieberman. In one analysis with Freud, Deutsch dreamt that she had both female and male organs. Through analysis with Freud, she discovered that her personality was largely determined by her "childhood wish to be simultaneously [her] father's prettiest daughter and cleverest son." After one year, Freud terminated Deutsch's analytic sessions, to instead work with the Wolf Man. Helene nevertheless was a brilliant clinician, who stood up to Freud and got away with it when she 'disagreed with him about her patients.'

Following Karl Abraham's presentation on femininity, penis envy and the feminine castration complex at the Hague Congress in 1920, Deutsch left analysis with Freud to work with Abraham. While at the Hague Congress, Deutsch presented her paper on The Psychology of Mistrust. In it, she claimed that lying was a defense against real events, as well as an act of creativity. In 1923, she moved to Berlin without her husband, Felix, or her son, Martin, to work with Abraham, who she felt probed more deeply than Freud. Helene felt relaxed while working with Abraham and enjoyed his 'cool analytic style and his objective insight without any reeling experience of transference.' While in session with her, Abraham showed her a letter from Freud addressed to him. In it, Freud argued that the topic of Deutsch's marriage with Felix should remain off the table during analysis. It was only later that Abraham confessed that he was unable to analyze her because he "had too much feeling for her." It is hypothesized that Freud, in abruptly terminating Helene's analysis and by sending the letter to Abraham, was trying to break Helene's compulsion to repeat.

In 1924, Deutsch returned to Austria from Berlin. She also returned to Felix and Freud. Her continued relationship with Freud was friendly, yet at times strained. Following Freud's death, however, she often referred to herself as Freud's ghost. That same year, Deutsch created and became the first President of the Vienna Training Institute.

The following year, in 1925, Deutsch published The Psychoanalysis of Women's Sexual Functions, the first psychoanalytic book to deal exclusively with women. In it, she diverged from Freudian logic inspiring its founder to concern himself more thoroughly with female sexuality. Deutsch argued that, in the phallic stage, the little girl's primary erogenous zone is the "masculine clitoris," which is inferior in entirety to the male penis, and the awareness of the inferiority of the clitoris would force the little girl to grow passive, inward, and turn away from her 'active sexuality'.

In 1935, after the end of the first Austrian Republic, Deutsch emigrated with her family from Vienna to Boston, Massachusetts, where she continued to work as a psychoanalyst until her death in 1982.

== On technique ==
'In a 1926 paper ... — which Freud later cited — she emphasizes that intuition, the analyst's ability to identify with the patient's transference fantasies, is a potent therapeutic tool', proving herself thereby a forerunner to much later work on the analyst's 'free-floating responsiveness ... as a crucial element in his "useful" countertransference'.

Deutsch was cautious about rigid adherence to the "Freudian method", which she regarded as an area of ongoing inquiry rather than a fixed system that could be mastered through routine training. She was also active as a training analyst and teacher; her seminars, often based on case studies, were attended by many students and sometimes extended late into the night.

== 1950 to death ==
After 1950, Deutsch began to say that she regretted being known primarily for her work with women's psychology. At this time, Deutsch began to turn her attention back to men's psychology and narcissism in both sexes. Over time, she became increasingly devoted to the study of egoism and narcissism, thereby abandoning her lifelong study of feminism.

In 1963, Deutsch retired as a training analyst in part due to her husband, Felix's, declining health and memory loss. In 1963, Felix Deutsch died. Following his death, Deutsch began to reminisce about her life with Felix and all that he had given her. Her relationship with Felix, up to that point, had always been a little bit strained. Through numerous affairs, like the one she had with Sándor Rado, Deutsch had always felt that Felix was more of the mother figure than she. According to Deutsch, "Felix seemed to have no trouble in 'naturally' displaying all the motherly ease. Even in situations in which a child usually calls for his mother, [Martin] turned more often to Felix than to me."

Following Felix's death in 1963, Deutsch turned her attention toward the sexual liberation of the 1960s and Beatlemania. She argued that these two events were due to fathers "taking a back-seat in childrearing". This absence of fathers then led to loneliness in children, who then sought solace with their peers.

Deutsch was elected a Fellow of the American Academy of Arts and Sciences in 1975.

On 29 March 1982, Deutsch died at the age of 97. In her last days of life, she remembered the "three men closest to her, combining Lieberman, Freud and her father into one man". In her autobiography Deutsch wrote that during the three main upheavals in her life, her freedom from her mother; "the revelation of socialism"; and her time with psychoanalysis, she was inspired and aided by either her father, Lieberman or Freud.

== Works ==
- Psychoanalysis of the Sexual Functions of Women, Internationaler Psychoanalytischer Verlag, Leipzig/Wien/Zürich, 1925 (Neue Arbeiten zur ärztlichen Psychoanalyse No. 5). Translated to English in 1991, ISBN 978-0-946439-95-9.
- The Psychology of Women, Volume 1: Girlhood, Allyn & Bacon, 1943, ISBN 978-0-205-10087-3.
- The Psychology of Women, Volume 2: Motherhood, Allyn & Bacon, 1945, ISBN 978-0-205-10088-0.
- Neuroses and Character Types, International Universities Press, 1965, ISBN 0-8236-3560-0 .
- Selected Problems of Adolescence, International Universities Press, 1967, ISBN 0-8236-6040-0.
- A Psychoanalytic Study of the Myth of Dionysus and Apollo, 1969, ISBN 0-8236-4975-X .
- Confrontations with Myself, Norton, 1973, ISBN 978-0-393-07472-7.
- The Therapeutic Process, the Self, and Female Psychology, 1992, ISBN 978-0-393-07472-7.

== See also ==
- Feminist views on the Oedipus complex
- Identity disturbance
- List of Poles
- Psychodynamics
