= Scheina Grebelskaja =

Russian psychoanalyst

Scheina Grebelskaja (1886-19?) was a Russian psychoanalyst who worked at the Burghölzli, the psychiatric hospital of the University of Zürich. She was one of the early pioneers in psychoanalytic theory. Her work was fundamental in supporting the Freudian theory about the existence of subconscious drives.

== Life ==
Scheina (Jenny) Grebelskaja, born in a Russian-Jewish family, was born in Derazhnya in the province of Podolia as the daughter of Samuel Grebinsky. She came to Zurich at the end of 1906, where she first had to take an entrance exam in German, Latin and natural history, before she could enroll in medicine in the winter semester of 1907/08. Scheina Grebelskaja studied with Eugen Bleuler and C.G. Jung and worked during the summer months as an assistant at the Burghölzli, the psychiatric hospital of the University of Zürich. She was a close friend of Sabina Spielrein.

In 1912 she received her doctorate under the guidance of C.G. Jung with a dissertation on the psychological analysis of a paranoid. In this work, highly valued by Viktor Tausk, she treated the homosexuality of a paranoid schizophrenic and confirmed with their case history Sigmund Freud's thesis that there is a connection between paranoia and repressed homosexual desires.

Scheina Grebelskaja returned to Russia in 1912 following her doctorate, where she worked as a gynecologist in a hospital in Odessa. After that, traces of her are lost.

== Bibliography ==
- Psychologische Analyse eines Paranoiden. Jb psychoanal psychopathol Forsch 4 (1), 1912, 116-140
