= Organ language =

Psychoanalytic theory

According to the psychoanalytic explanation of psychosomatic illness, organ language is the bodily expression of an unconscious conflict as a form of symbolic communication. It is also called organ-speech, a term that Sigmund Freud uses in his 1915 essay "The Unconscious" attributing its coinage to Victor Tausk.

== History ==
In 1915 Freud wrote:

In agreement with Tausk, I would here lay stress on the point that the relation to the bodily organ ... has usurped the place of the whole content of the thought. The schizophrenic speech displays a hypochondriac trait: it has become "organ-speech" (German: Organsprache).

Alfred Adler used the term "organ dialect" as early as 1912, when he wrote a paper of that name. He later borrowed the term "organ jargon" that had been coined by Georg Groddeck, and also synonymously employed the term organ language.

== Definition ==
According to the American Psychiatric Association,

Some believe that understanding the significance to the patient of the organ affected by the illness is essential for accurate diagnosis and treatment. For example, chronic lumbago (lower backache) with no identifiable organic cause may mean that the patient is feeling put upon, is being a martyr, or is aiming too low in life.

In other words, the target organ, tissue or somatic function would be semantically related to the repressed mental content.

== Further examples ==
"Two persons may suffer from leg pains that have no basis in organic disease. One of them could say: 'I can't stand on my own two feet,' expressing a conviction that he or she must depend on the help of others to meet life's challenges, while the other could reply: 'I can't stand it!', declaring an inability to endure a particular pressure or difficult situation". One might discover that a client, experiencing heart trouble for which there is no medical explanation, is expressing heartbreak". "Difficulty in swallowing may represent an unpalatable situation; an asthmatic episode may symbolize a load on the chest; itching may symbolize irritation or that 'something has gotten under the person's skin'." "A chronically uncontrollable contraction of the hand into a clenched fist [...] may symbolize hostility as much as angry words do. Hysterical seizures may, in a distorted fashion, express sexuality or tantrum-like hostility and anger. [...] Blurred vision and functional blindness have been interpreted in various cases as an expression of guilt consequent on real or fancied misdeeds, a fear of the outer world and a magical attempt to do away with it, or a reaction-formation to the unconscious wish to be a voyeur. A hand paralysis may symbolize masturbation guilt or a struggle to inhibit hostility." "Difficulty in swallowing food has been interpreted by analysts as evidence of something 'unpalatable' in the person's life situation; nausea is inability to 'stomach' something unpleasant; vomiting is rejection; asthmatic difficulties symbolize the existence of a load on one's chest; pain in the shoulder or arm indicates an inhibited impulse to strike out aggressively; and neurodermatitic itching is a somatic expression of the saying, 'He gets under my skin'."

== Divergence with the psychiatric paradigm ==
Psychiatry not influenced by such psychoanalytic ideas rejects both the semantic correlation with the target organ and that the cause is an unconscious conflict. If anything, psychosomatizations are due to stress affecting a "constitutional" target organ, correlated by hereditary factors. For the psychiatrist Jurgen Ruesch, these disorders represent an infantile use of body language by individuals who are unable to express themselves effectively by verbal means.

== See also ==
- Conversion disorder
- Somatization disorder
