= Daniel Heller-Roazen =

Canadian philosopher

Daniel Heller-Roazen is the Arthur W. Marks '19 Professor of Comparative Literature at Princeton University. Born in Toronto in 1974, he earned his bachelor of arts degree from the University of Toronto and completed his graduate work at Johns Hopkins University. In 2002, he received a New Directions Fellowship from the Andrew W. Mellon Foundation. He is one of the translators into English of work by Giorgio Agamben. He was elected as a member of the American Academy of Arts and Sciences in 2018. His father was the historian of psychoanalysis, Paul Roazen.

== Books in English ==
- (ed. and tr.) Potentialities: Collected Essays in Philosophy by Giorgio Agamben, 1999.
- Fortune's Faces: The Roman de la Rose and the Poetics of Contingency, 2003.
- Echolalias: On the Forgetting of Language, 2005.
- The Inner Touch: Archaeology of a Sensation, 2007. Winner of the Modern Language Association's 2008 Aldo and Jeanne Scaglione Prize for Comparative Literary Studies.
- The Enemy of All: Piracy and the Law of Nations, 2009.
- (ed.) The Arabian Nights, Norton Critical Edition, 2010.
- The Fifth Hammer: Pythagoras and the Disharmony of the World, 2011.
- Dark Tongues: The Art of Rogues and Riddlers, 2013.
- No One's Ways: An Essay on Infinite Naming, 2017.
- Absentees: On Variously Missing Persons, 2021
- Far Calls: On Omens, Slips, and Epiphanies, 2025
