= Paul Roazen =

American political scientist (1936–2005)

Paul Roazen (August 14, 1936, Boston – November 3, 2005) was an American political scientist who became a preeminent historian of psychoanalysis.

== Life ==
Roazen received his A.B. at Harvard University in 1958. He then studied at the University of Chicago and Magdalen College, Oxford, before returning to Harvard for his PhD dissertation on Freud's political and social thought. After teaching at Harvard as an assistant professor in Government, he taught Social and Political Science at York University in Toronto from 1971 until his early retirement in 1995.

In 1965 Roazen began to interview surviving friends, relatives, colleagues and patients of Sigmund Freud. His first 'big' book, 1975's Freud and His Followers, was based on hundreds of hours of interviews with patients and students of Freud. The resulting portrait of Freud illustrated biases and indiscretions that seemed inconsistent with his stated methods. This was a pathbreaking and influential work, which remains a basic reference for historians of psychoanalysis today.

Roazen was the first non-psychoanalyst whom Anna Freud allowed to access the archives of the British Psychoanalytic Institute. He was able to see the huge amount of material Ernest Jones had used to write his biography of Freud.

In 1993 Roazen became a Fellow of the Royal Society of Canada and in 2004 he became an honorary member of the American Psychoanalytic Association.

His papers are collected in the Paul Roazen Collection of the Howard Gotlieb Archival Research Center, Boston University.

On November 3, 2005, he died at age 69 at his home in Cambridge from complications of Crohn's disease. He was survived by two sons, one of whom is professor of comparative literature Daniel Heller-Roazen.

== Writings ==
Author

- Freud: Political and Social Thought, New York, Knopf, 1968
- Brother Animal: The Story of Freud and Tausk, N.Y., Knopf, 1969
- Freud and his Followers, New York, Knopf, 1975
- Erik H. Erikson: The Power and Limits of a Vision, N.Y., The Free Press, 1976
- Helene Deutsch: A Psychoanalyst’s Life, N.Y., Doubleday, 1985
- "Freud's Last Will", in Journal of the American Academy of Psychoanalysis, 18(3), 1990, 383–385.
- Encountering Freud: The Politics and Histories of Psychoanalysis, New Brunswick, N.J., Transaction Publishers, 1990
- Meeting Freud’s Family, Amherst, University of Massachusetts Press, 1993
- Heresy: Sandor Rado and the Psychoanalytic Movement, with Bluma Swerdloff, Northvale, N.J., Aronson, 1995
- How Freud Worked: First-Hand Accounts of Patients, Northvale, N.J., J. Aronson, 1995
- Canada’s King: An Essay in Political Psychology, Oakville, Ontario, Mosaic Press, 1998
- Oedipus in Britain: Edward Glover and the Struggle over Klein, N.Y., Other Press, 2000
- Political Theory and the Psychology of the Unconscious: Freud, J. S. Mill, Nietzsche, Dostoevsky, Fromm, Bettelheim, and Erikson, London, Open Gate Press, 2000
- The Historiography of Psychoanalysis, New Brunswick (US); London (UK), Transaction Publishers, 2001
- The Trauma of Freud: Controversies in Psychoanalysis, New Brunswick, N.J., Transaction Publishers, 2002
- Cultural Foundations of Political Psychology, New Brunswick, N.J., Transaction Publishers, 2003
- On The Freud Watch: Public Memoirs, London, Free Association Books, 2003
- Edoardo Weiss: The House that Freud Built, New Brunswick, N.J., Transaction Publishers, 2005

Editor

- Victor Tausk: Sexuality, War, and Schizophrenia: Collected Psychoanalytic Papers, edited and with an introduction by Paul Roazen, translations by Eric Mosbacher and others. Taylor & Francis, 1991.

== See also ==
- Henri Ellenberger
- Élisabeth Roudinesco
