= Ludwig Jekels =

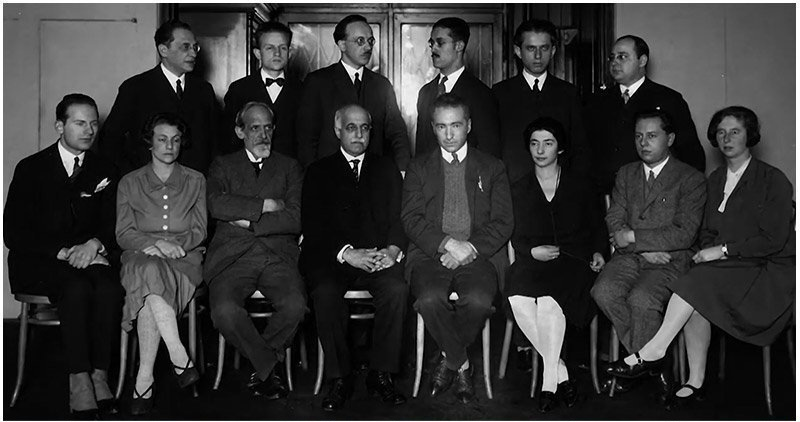
- Ludwig Jekels (third from left, bottom row) at the Vienna Psychoanalytic Ambulatorium in 1922
- Born: August 15, 1867; Lemberg, Austria-Hungary
- Died: April 13, 1954 (aged 86); New York City, U.S.
- Education: University of Vienna
- Known for: Early psycho-history, translations of Freud into Polish
- Spouse: Helena Ivánka
- Scientific career
- Fields: Psychiatry, neurology, psychoanalysis

Ludwig Jekels (or Jekeles; August 15, 1867, Lemberg, Austria-Hungary, now Lviv, Ukraine – April 13, 1954, New York City) was an Austrian physician and early psychoanalyst.

== Biography ==
Originally from Austria-Hungary, Jekels obtained his medical degree from the University of Vienna in 1892. At the university clinic, he specialized in psychiatry and neurology over the next five years. In 1897, he founded a private sanatorium for the treatment of nervous diseases in Bistrai (now Bystra), Silesia.

Learning about the work of Sigmund Freud, he became interested in then-nascent psychoanalysis, and participated in the first Congress of the International Psychoanalytical Association in Salzburg in 1908, then became a member of Wednesday Psychological Society from 1910. He moved to Vienna to become more involved in the psychoanalytic movement, alongside Freud. Freud cited Jekels's work on auto-erotic drives in his 1915 Papers on Metapsychology. Jekels also attempted to introduce psychoanalysis into Poland and translated Freud's texts into Polish, including (with his wife Helena Ivánka) the Psychopathology of Everyday Life.

Jekels treated 15-year-old Anna Freud in the summer of 1910 for her psychological problems in his sanatorium. Her father thanked Jekels profusely for the positive result. Jekels made no secret of the fact that he couldn't stand his other patients when talking to Anna and her aunt Minna Bernays. He closed his sanatorium two years later.

Jekels's "The Turning Point in the Life of Napoleon I" (1914) was an early example of psycho-history. He also attempted to interpret Shakespeare's works from a psychoanalytical point of view in the work "Psychoanalytical Structure of Macbeth."

Jekels was a staunch socialist and later joined the communist movement in Austria. Faced with the advent of Nazism in Austria, Jekels left the country in 1935 for Sweden, which he then left for the United States. There he became an Honorary Member of the New York Psychoanalytic Society.

== Selected publications ==
- Leczenie psychonewroz za pomoca metody psychoanalitysnej Freuda, tudziez kazuistyka, 1909, Med. Kron Lek, Warsaw.
- "Einige Bemerkungen zur Trieblehre," in Internationale Zeitschrift für Psychoanalyse, 1913, 1, 439–443.
- "Der Wendepunkt im Leben Napoleons I," in Imago, 1914, 3, 313–381.
- "The Problem of the Duplicated Expression of Psychic Themes," in International Journal of Psycho-Analysis 1933, 14, ss. 300-309.
- "Die psychoanalytische Therapie," in Svenska Läkartidningen, 1936, 33, 1797–1802, 1821–1831.
- Selected Papers, 1957. London: Imago.
