= Grete L. Bibring =

Austrian-American psychoanalyst, medical professor (1899–1977)

Grete Bibring
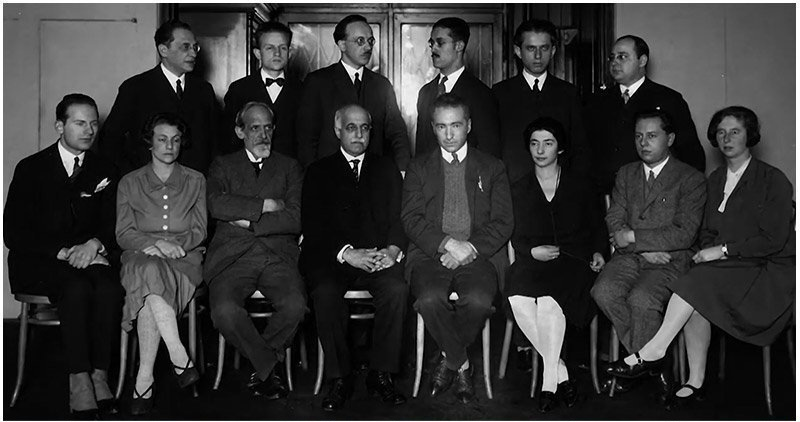
- Grete L. Bibring seated third from the right
- Born: Margarethe Lehner; January 11, 1899; Vienna, Austria-Hungary
- Died: August 10, 1977 (aged 78); Cambridge, Massachusetts, U.S.
- Education: University of Vienna
- Spouse: Edward Bibring (1921 - 1959)
- Children: George Bibring, Thomas Bibring
- Scientific career
- Fields: Psychoanalysis
- Workplaces: Beth Israel Hospital; Harvard Medical School

Grete Bibring (née Margarethe Lehner; 1899–1977) was an Austrian-American psychoanalyst who became the first female full professor at Harvard Medical School in 1961.

== Life ==
=== Vienna ===
Grete Bibring was born as Margarethe Lehner on January 11, 1899, in Vienna, Austria. She was the youngest child of factory owner Moriz Lehner and his wife Victoria Josefine Lehner, née Stengel. Her siblings were two older brothers, Ernst and Fritz, and a sister, Rosi. Her upbringing was amongst a wealthy Jewish family that often hosted dinner parties and imparted to her an appreciation for music, science, and art. She attended Akademisches Gymnasium (Humanistic Gymnasium for Girls) until 1918, when she graduated. During her time at school, she excelled at Greek and Latin and became familiar with the works of Sigmund Freud. After graduation, she began studying at the University of Vienna in the same year. During her studies she met Edward Bibring, a fellow medical student and dissection class partner, whom she later married in December 1921.

She graduated from the University of Vienna in 1924, going on to specialize in neurology and psychiatry. Alongside joining the Vienna Psychoanalytic Society, she also became one of the first students at the Vienna Training Institute in 1925. Bibring went on to work at a psychoanalytic clinic as a training analyst and instructor for some years, later becoming a member of the education committee of the Vienna Association in 1934.

=== America ===
In May 1938, the invasion of Austria by the Nazis forced Bibring and her family, as Jews in danger of deportation or murder, to flee to London. While in London, Grete Bibring became a member of the British Psycho-Analytical Society. Edward Bibring was then invited to teach at Tufts University in Boston, Massachusetts. He accepted the position and, in 1941, Grete and Edward Bibring, along with their children George and Thomas, emigrated to America. Once in Boston, the two were among a group of "second generation" Freudian Scholars from overseas who popularized the concept of ego psychology in America. Bibring officially became an American citizen in 1946 and continued her work and research, establishing many positions, consultancies, and fellowship in a variety of institutions and organizations.

In 1959, at the age of 64, her husband died of Parkinson's Disease. Bibring carried on in the field of psychoanalysis and continued to treat clients up to her death on August 10, 1977, aged 78, in Cambridge, Massachusetts.

== Career ==
During her time in Vienna, Bibring published her first work on psychoanalysis in 1933 titled "The Phallic Phase and its Disturbances in Young Girls" for the journal Zeitschrift für psychoanalytische Pädagogik. She held positions as a training analyst and teacher at the Vienna Psychoanalytic Institution from 1933 to 1938, when the Anschluss drove her and her family to London first, then to America in 1941.

In 1961, Bibring became the first female professor at Harvard Medical School. She also lectured on psychoanalytic psychology at Simmons College School of Social Work in Boston from 1942 to 1955. As well, she was the director of the psychiatry department at the Beth Israel Hospital from 1946 to 1955, in which time she reorganized the psychiatric teaching unit. In 1955, she became director of psychiatric research and the hospital's psychiatrist-in-chief until her retirement in 1965. Even though she retired formally, she continued to dedicate herself to treating patients until two weeks before her death.

Bibring was also affiliated with other institutions which included Radcliffe College in Cambridge, where she was a consultant for research, and the Children's Bureau in Washington, where she was a psychiatric consultant. Amongst professional societies, she was a training analyst at the Boston Psychoanalytic Society and Institute and was elected its president in 1955, Vice President of the International Psychoanalytic Society and Institute from 1959 to 1963, and was President of the American Psychoanalytic Association in 1962–1963. In 1968, she accepted a fellowship at the American Academy of Arts and Sciences.

Bibring's pioneering work included observations of the effects of environmental stress on individuals as well as how aspects of pregnancy are interpreted through a psychoanalytic lens, where she concluded that affective issues experienced by women during pregnancy might be brought on by environmental stresses that may affect women who are not pregnant in different ways.

== Selected publications ==
- Bibring, G. L. (1953). "On the 'passing of the Oedipus complex' in a matriarchal family setting." In Drives, Affects, Behavior. Loewenstein, Rudolph M., (Ed) 278–284, International Universities Press, Madison, CT
- Bibring, G. L. (1954). "The training analysis and its place in psycho-analytic training." The International Journal of Psychoanalysis, 35, 169–173.
- Bibring, G. L., Dwyer, T. F., Huntington, D. S., and Valenstein, A. F. (1962). A study of the psychological processes in pregnancy and of the earliest mother-child relationship. The Psychoanalytic Study of the Child, 16, 9-72.
- Bibring, Grete; Kahana, Ralph J. (1968). Lectures in Medical Psychology: An Introduction to the Care of Patients. New York, NY: International Universities Press.
- Bibring, Grete L., ed. (1968). The Teaching of Dynamic Psychiatry: A Reappraisal of the Goals and Techniques in the Teaching of Psychoanalytic Psychiatry. Symposium on the Teaching of Dynamic Psychiatry. New York, NY: International Universities Press.
