= Breaking point (psychology) =

Critical moment of stress within the mind

In human psychology, the breaking point is a moment of stress in which a person breaks down or a situation becomes critical. The intensity of environmental stress necessary to bring this about varies from individual to individual.

== Interrogation ==
Getting someone to confess to a crime during an interrogation – whether innocent or guilty – means the suspect has been broken. The key to breaking points in interrogation has been linked to changes in the victim's concept of self – changes which may be precipitated by a sense of helplessness, by lack of preparedness or an underlying sense of guilt, as well (paradoxically) as by an inability to acknowledge one's own vulnerabilities.

== Life ==
Psychoanalysts like Ronald Fairbairn and Neville Symington considered that everybody has a potential breaking point in life, with vulnerability particularly intense at early developmental stages.

Some psychoanalysts say that rigid personalities may be able to endure great stress before suddenly cracking open.

== See also ==
- Abreaction
- Psychotic break

== Bibliography ==
- Berne, Eric (1976). A Layman's Guide to Psychiatry and Psychoanalysis.
- Fenichel, Otto (1946). The Psychoanalytic Theory of Neurosis.
- Goleman, D. (1996). Emotional Intelligence.
- Gudjonsson, G. H. (2003). The Psychology of Interrogation and Confession.
- Kimble, G. A. (1996). Psychology.
- Skynner, R.; Cleese, J. (1994). Families and how to survive them.
- Symington, Neville (2000). Narcissism: A New Theory.
