= Somatization =

Medical symptoms caused by psychological stress

Somatization is the generation of somatic symptoms due to psychological distress, often coinciding with a tendency to seek medical help for them. The term somatization was introduced by Wilhelm Stekel in 1924.

Somatization is a worldwide phenomenon, with chronic cases being classified as somatic symptom disorder.

== Associated conditions ==
Somatization can be, but is not always, related to certain psychiatric conditions such as:

- Mood disorders (e.g., major depressive disorder)
- Anxiety disorders
- Somatic symptom disorder

The American Psychiatric Association (APA) has classified somatoform disorders in the DSM-IV and the World Health Organization (WHO) have classified these in the ICD-10. Both classification systems use similar criteria. Most current practitioners will use one over the other, though in cases of borderline diagnoses, both systems may be referred to.

== Theory ==
=== Ego defense ===
In psychodynamic theory, somatization is conceptualized as an ego defense, the unconscious rechannelling of repressed emotions into somatic symptoms as a form of symbolic communication (organ language).

Sigmund Freud's case study of Anna O. featured a woman who suffered from numerous physical symptoms, which Freud believed were the result of repressed grief over her father's illness, although his assessment has been questioned by later research as treatment did not resolve her symptoms.

== Treatment ==
Treatment for somatic symptom disorder typically combines different strategies for managing the patient's symptoms including regularly scheduled outpatient visits, psychosocial interventions (e.g., joint meetings with family members), psychoeducation, and treatment of prominent comorbid symptoms of anxiety or depression.

Based on multiple systematic reviews, the initial suggested treatment for somatic symptom disorder is regular, scheduled outpatient visits every 4–8 weeks that are not based on active symptoms. These visits often focus on establishing a therapeutic alliance, legitimizing the somatic symptoms, and limiting diagnostic tests and referral to specialists.

== See also ==
- Psychosomatic medicine
- Identified patient
- Somatosensory amplification
- Hypochondriasis
- Medically unexplained physical symptoms
- Nocebo
- Somatic marker hypothesis
