= Internationale Zeitschrift für Psychoanalyse =

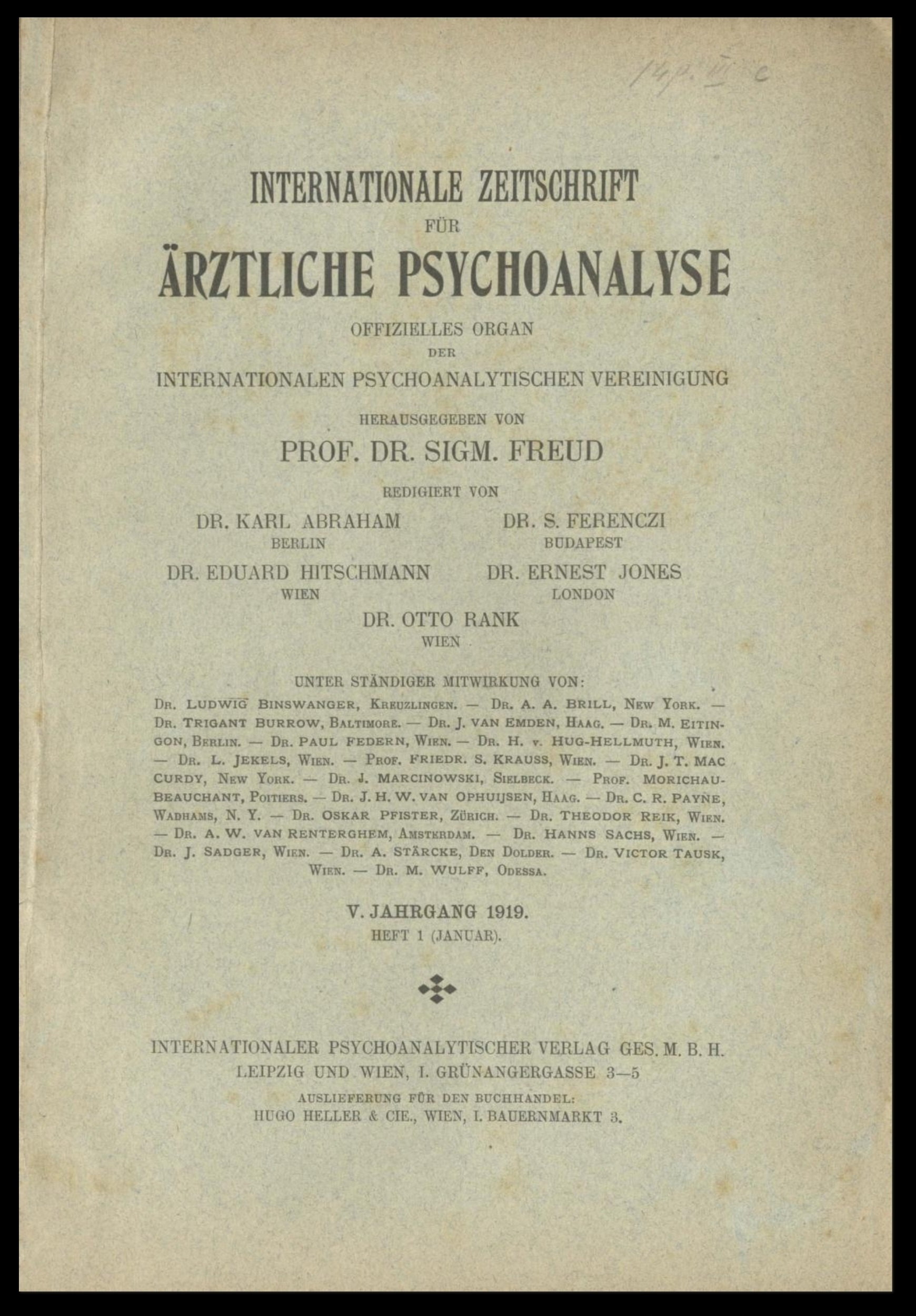
- Cover of the January 1919 issue
- Discipline: Psychoanalysis
- Language: German

Publication details
- Former name: Internationale Zeitschrift für ärztliche Psychoanalyse
- History: 1913–1941
- Publisher: International Psychoanalytic Association

Standard abbreviations
- ISO 4: Int. Z. Psychoanal.

The Internationale Zeitschrift für Psychoanalyse (English: International Journal of Psychoanalysis) was a German-language psychoanalytic journal, which was published from 1913 to 1937 and from 1939 to 1941 by the International Psychoanalytic Association.

== Famous papers ==
Viktor Tausk's paper "On the Origin of the "Influencing Machine" in Schizophrenia" (German: Über die Entstehung des „Beeinflussungsapparates“ in der Schizophrenie) was first published in the Internationale Zeitschrift für Psychoanalyse in 1919.

Wilhelm Reich's paper "Concerning Specific Forms of Masturbation" (German: Über Spezifität der Onanieformen) was published in the Internationale Zeitschrift für Psychoanalyse in 1922.

== See also ==
- International Journal of Psychoanalysis, an English-language journal established in 1920.
