= Vamık Volkan =

Turkish psychiatrist (born 1932)

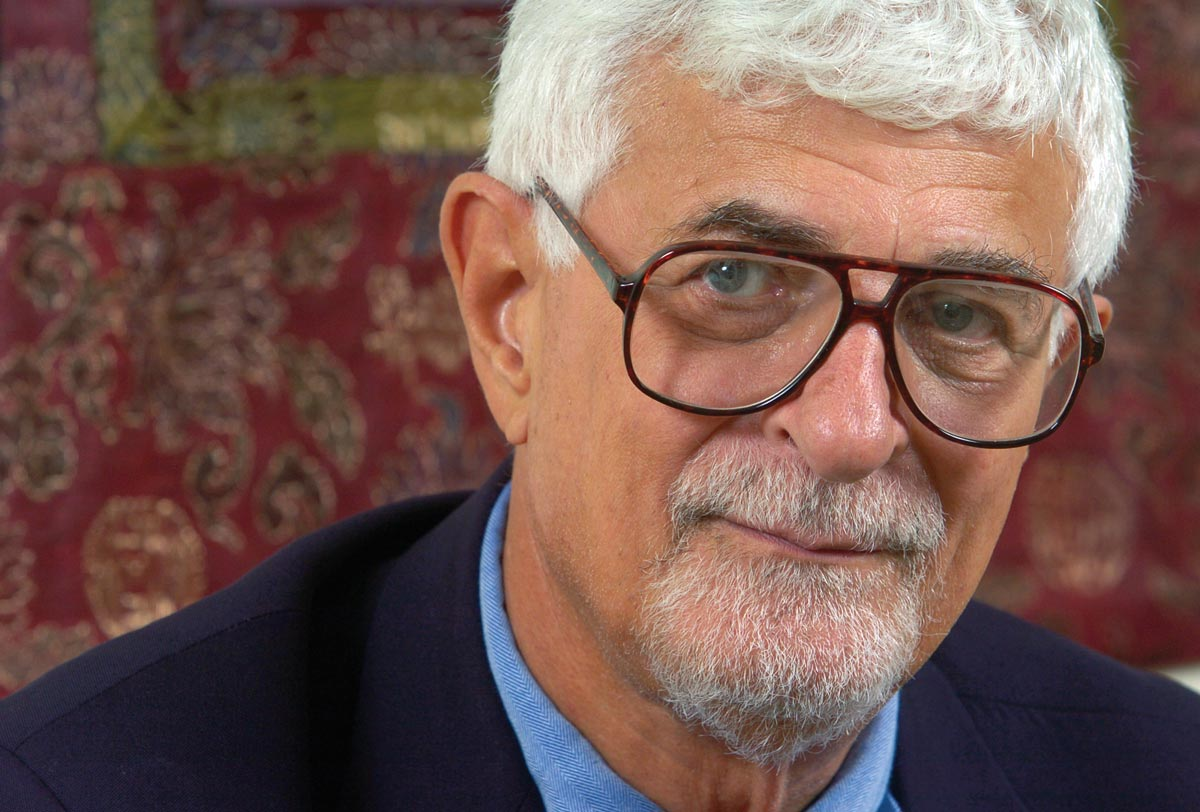
Vamık Volkan in 2007

Vamık D. Volkan, M.D., DFLAPA, FACPsa, (born 1932 in Lefkoşa, Cyprus) is a Turkish Cypriot born American psychiatrist, internationally known for his 40 years work bringing together conflictual groups for dialogue and mutual understanding. Among his many other honours, he is the president emeritus of International Dialogue Initiative (IDI).

== Biography ==
Vamık D. Volkan is an emeritus professor of psychiatry at the University of Virginia, Charlottesville, Virginia and an emeritus training and supervising analyst at the Washington Psychoanalytic Institute, Washington, D.C. During his 39 years at the University of Virginia Volkan was the medical director of the university's Blue Ridge Hospital for eighteen years. A year after his 2002 retirement, he became the Senior Erik Erikson Scholar at the Erikson Institute of the Austen Riggs Center, Stockbridge, Massachusetts, and he has spent three to six months there each year for ten years.

In the early 1980s Volkan was a member and later the chairman of the American Psychiatric Association's Committee on Psychiatry and Foreign Affairs. This committee brought influential Israelis, Egyptians and Palestinians for unofficial negotiations. In 1987, Volkan established the Center for the Study of Mind and Human Interaction (CSMHI) at the School of Medicine, University of Virginia. CSMHI applied a growing theoretical and field-proven base of knowledge to issues such as ethnic tension, racism, large-group identity, terrorism, societal trauma, immigration, mourning, transgenerational transmissions, leader-follower relationships, and other aspects of national and international conflict. The CSMHI's faculty included experts in psychoanalysis, psychiatry, psychology, diplomacy, history, political science, and environmental policy. In 1987 the Soviet Duma signed a contract with the CSMHI to examine existing difficulties between the Soviet Union and United States. Later the CSMHI members worked in the Baltic Republics, Kuwait, Albania, former Yugoslavia, Georgia, South Ossetia, Turkey, Greece, and elsewhere. Volkan founded the CSMHI's journal, Mind & Human Interaction, which examined the relationship between psychoanalysis and history, political science and other fields.

Volkan was a member of the International Negotiation Network (INN) under the directorship of the former president Jimmy Carter (1989–2000) and also a member of the Working Group on Terror and Terrorism, International Psychoanalytic Association. He was a temporary consultant to the World Health Organization (WHO) in Albania and Macedonia. He had the honor to give the keynote address in Cape Town, South Africa in 2006, celebrating Archbishop Desmond Tutu's life of peaceful justice and the 10th anniversary of the Truth and Reconciliation Commission's activities. He also was honored on several occasions by being nominated for the Nobel Peace Prize. Letters of support were sent from 27 countries.

Volkan holds Honorary Doctorate degrees from Kuopio University (now called the University of Eastern Finland), Finland, from Ankara University, Turkey, and the Eastern European Psychoanalytic Institute, Russia. He was a former president of the Turkish-American Neuropsychiatric Society, the International Society of Political Psychology, the Virginia Psychoanalytic Society, and the American College of Psychoanalysts. He was an Inaugural Yitzak Rabin Fellow, Rabin Center for Israeli Studies, Tel Aviv, Israel; a visiting professor of law, Harvard University, Boston, Massachusetts; a visiting professor of political science at the University of Vienna, Vienna, Austria and at Bahceșehir University, Istanbul, Turkey. He worked as a visiting professor of psychiatry at three universities in Turkey. In 2006, he was Fulbright/Sigmund Freud-Privatstiftung Visiting Scholar of Psychoanalysis in Vienna, Austria. In 2015, he became a visiting professor at El Bosque University, Bogota, Colombia.

He was a member of the International Advisory Board, Leonard Davis Institute for International Relations, Hebrew University of Jerusalem; an Inaugural Yitzak Rabin Fellow, Rabin Center for Israeli Studies, Tel Aviv, Israel; an honorary supervisor and consultant, Società per lo studio dei disturbi della personalità in Milan, Italy; chairperson of the Select Advisory Commission of the Federal Bureau of Investigation's Critical Incident Response Group that examined the 1993 Waco, Texas incident; a visiting professor of law, Harvard University, Boston, Massachusetts; a visiting professor of political science at the University of Vienna, Vienna, Austria and at Bahceșehir University, Istanbul, Turkey; a board member of the Freud Foundation in Vienna and a member of the Working Group on Terror and Terrorism, International Psychoanalytic Association.

Dr. Volkan was recognized by Natur och Kultur, Stockholm, Sweden for Outstanding Contributions to the Psychoanalytic Study of Societies. He was elected to Honorary Membership in the European Confederation of Psychoanalytic Psychotherapies (ECPP) as a Practitioner, a Training Analyst and a Supervisor. He was also elected to Honorary Membership in the Association for Psychodynamic Psychotherapy, Finland and Turku Psychotherapy Association, Finland.

Among many awards he received are Nevitt Sanford Award, Elise M. Hayman Award, L. Bryce Boyer Award, Margaret Mahler Literature Prize, Hans H. Strupp Award, the American College of Psychoanalysts' Distinguished Officer Award for 2014. He also received the Sigmund Freud Award given by the city of Vienna, Austria, in collaboration with the World Council of Psychotherapy and Mary S. Sigourney Award for 2015. The Sigourney Award was given to him because he was due to his being a seminal contributor "to the application of psychoanalytic thinking to conflicts between countries and cultures," and because "his clinical thinking about the use of object relations theory in primitive mental states has advanced our understanding of severe personality disorders."

Volkan is the author, coauthor, editor or coeditor of over fifty psychoanalytic and psychopolitical books some of which has been translated into Turkish, German, Russian, Spanish, Japanese, Greek and Finnish. He has written hundreds of published papers and book chapters. He has served on the editorial boards of sixteen national or international professional journals, including The Journal of the American Psychoanalytic Association. Volkan was the Guest Editor of the Diamond Jubilee Special Issue of The American Journal of Psychoanalysis, 2015.

Volkan has given hundreds of keynote addresses and lectures in Australia, Austria, Bosnia, Brazil, Canada, Chile, China, Columbia, Croatia, Cyprus, Egypt, Estonia, Georgia, Germany, Great Britain, Greece, Holland, Israel, India, Italy, Lebanon, Malaysia, Mexico, New Zealand, Northern Cyprus, Norway, Peru, Poland, Russia, Serbia, Senegal, Slovenia, South Africa, South Ossetia, Spain, Sweden, Switzerland, Turkey and the U.S.

Volkan is the president emeritus of the International Dialogue Initiative (IDI) which he established in 2007. The IDI members are unofficial representatives from Turkey, Iran, Israel, Germany, Russia, the United Kingdom, the United States, and the West Bank. They meet twice a year to examine world affairs primarily from a psychopolitical point of view. Volkan continues to lecture nationally and internationally.

== Theories ==
Volkan's research focuses on the application of psychoanalytic thinking between countries and cultures, individual and societal mourning, transgenerational transmissions of trauma and the therapeutic approach to primitive mental states. He developed unofficial diplomacy's "Tree Model," described "Linking Objects" and "Linking Phenomena" of perennial mourners, observed "Chosen Traumas" and "Chosen Glories" of societies and theorized the evolution of "Infantile Psychotic Self" in persons whose mental functions remain undeveloped.

Linking objects – which may be actual objects, or actions, or some other form of identification with the dead – serve to tie mourners (often by way of a chance association) to the moment of their actual loss. Volkan's "re-grief therapy", building on the work of Edward Bibring, sought to free pathological mourners by taking them back "to review the circumstances of the death – how it occurred, the patient's reaction to the news and to viewing the body, the events of the funeral, etc.".

== Bibliography ==
=== Books ===
- (1976). Volkan, V. D., Primitive Internalized Object Relations: A Clinical Study of Schizophrenic, Borderline and Narcissistic Patients. New York: International Universities Press. (Foreword by O.F. Kernberg). (Turkish Edition:Psikoterapide Nesne Ilişkileri. Trans. by A. A. Köşkdere. Bursa: Terapi Psikiyatri Merkezi, 2007).
- (1979). Volkan, V.D., Cyprus – War and Adaptation: A Psychoanalytic History of Two Ethnic Groups in Conflict. Charlottesville, Virginia: University Press of Virginia. (Foreword by J. E. Mack). (Turkish Edition) Kıbrıs: Savaş ve Uyum: Çatışan İki Etnik Grubun Psikoanalitik Tarihi. Trans. B. Kılınçer. Istanbul: Everest Yayınları, 2008. Updated version: London: OA Press, 2011)
- (1981). Volkan, V.D., Linking Objects and Linking Phenomena: A Study of the Forms, Symptoms, Metapsychology and Therapy of Complicated Mourning. New York: International Universities Press. (Foreword by H. F. Searles).
- (1984). Volkan, V. D., What Do You Get When You Cross a Dandelion with a Rose? The True Story of a Psychoanalysis. New York: Jason Aronson.
- (1984). Volkan, V. D. & Itzkowitz, N., The Immortal Atatürk: A Psychobiography. Chicago: University of Chicago Press. (Greek edition: Atatoypk, tr. Kostas Zervos. Athens: Kostanidis, 2005;Turkish edition: Ölümsüz Atatürk: Istanbul: Bağlam Yayınevi, 1998, 2009).
- (1985). Volkan, V. D. (Ed.), Depressive States and Their Treatment. Northvale, NJ: Jason Aronson.
- (1987). Volkan, V. D., Six Steps in the Treatment of Borderline Personality Organization. New York: Jason Aronson. (Turkish edition: 6 Adımda "Borderline" Kişilik Organizasyonun Tedavisi. Ankara: Pusula, 2016).
- (1988). Volkan, V. D., (As a member of the GAP Committee on International Relations), Us and Them: The Psychology of Ethnocentrism. New York: Brunner/Mazel.
- (1988). Volkan, V. D., The Need to Have Enemies and Allies: From Clinical Practice to International Relationships. Northvale, NJ: Jason Aronson. (Foreword by J. V. Montville).
- (1988). Volkan, V. D. & Rodgers, T. C. (Eds.), Attitudes of Entitlement – Theoretical and Clinical Issues, Charlottesville, Virginia: University Press of Virginia.
- (1990). Volkan, V. D., Julius, D. A. & Montville, J. V. (Eds.), The Psychodynamics of International Relationships, Vol. I: Concepts and Theories. Lexington, MA: Lexington Books.
- (1991). Volkan, V. D., Montville, J. V. & Julius, Demetrios A. (Eds.), The Psychodynamics of International Relationships, Vol. II: Unofficial Diplomacy at Work. Lexington, MA: Lexington Books.
- (1991). Socarides, C. W. & Volkan, V. D. (Eds.), Homosexuality: Reality, Myth and the Arts. Madison, CT: International Universities Press.
- (1991). Socarides, C.W. & Volkan, V. D. (Eds.), The Homosexualities and the Therapeutic Process. Madison, CT: International Universities Press.
- (1992). Volkan, V.D., Nesne İlişkileri Kuramı Çevresinde Gelişim ve Organizasyon (Development and Organization as Examined from an Object Relations Point of View). Trans. B. Ceyhun. Ankara: Başbakanlık Basımevi.
- (1992). Volkan, V. D., Psikanaliz Yazıları (Essays on Psychoanalysis). Trans. by A. Çevik and B. Ceyhun. Ankara: Hekimler Yayın Birliği.
- (1992). Volkan, V. D., Politikal Psikoloji (Political Psychology). Trans. A. Çevik & B. Ceyhun. Ankara: Hekimler Yayın Birliği. (Second Edition published by the University of Ankara Press, 1994).
- (1992.) Volkan, V. D., & Ast, G., Eine Borderline-Therapie: Strukturelle und Objektbeziehungskonflikte in der Psychoanalyse der Borderline-Persönlichkeits Organisation (A Borderline Therapy: Structural and Object Relations Conflict in the Psychoanalysis of Borderline Personality Organization.) Göttingen: Vandenhoeck and Ruprecht.
- (1993). Volkan, V. D., Etnik Terörismin Psikolojisi (Psychology of Ethnic Terrorism). Trans. A. Çevik & B. Ceyhun. Ankara: Politik Psikoloji Yayınları.
- (1993). Volkan, V. D. & Zintl, E., Life After Loss: Lessons of Grief. New York, NY: Charles Scribner's Sons. (German edition: Wege der Trauer: Leben mit Tod und Verlust Tr. A. Potts. Giessen: Psychosozial-Verlag, 2000; Russian edition: Zhizn posle utraty: Psikhologiia gorevaniia. Moscow: Cogito-Centre, 2008; Turkish Edition: Gidenin Ardından. Trans. I. Vahip & M. Kocadere. Istanbul: Oa Publishing, 2010 and Serbian Edition, 2019)
- (1994). Volkan, V. D. & Itzkowitz, N., Turks and Greeks: Neighbors in Conflict. Cambridgeshire, England: Eothen Press. (Turkish edition: Türkler ve Yunanlılar: Çatışan Komşular. Istanbul: Bağlam Yayınevi. 1995).
- (1994). Volkan, V.D. & Çevik, A., Depresyonun Psikodinamik Etiyolojisi. (Psychodynamic Etiology of Depression). Ankara: Türk Tabibler Birligi.
- (1994). Volkan, V. D. & Ast, G., Spektrum des Narzißmus: Eine klinische Studie des gesunden Narzißmus, des narzißtisch-masochistischen Charakters, der narzißtischen Persönlichkeitsorganisation, des malignen Narzißmus und des erfolgreichen Narzißmus. Göttingen: Vandenhoeck & Ruprecht. (Turkish edition: Özsevinin Dokusu Trans. by B. Özbaran & S. Pırıldar. Izmir, Turkey: Halime Odağ Psikoanaliz ve Psikoterapi Vakfı, 2007).
- (1995). Volkan, V. D., The Infantile Psychotic Self: Understanding and Treating Schizophrenics and Other Difficult Patients. Northvale, NJ: Jason Aronson. (German Edition: Das infantile psychotische Selbst und seine weitere Göttingen: Vandenhoeck & Ruprecht, 2004).
- (1996). Volkan, V. D. Psikoanaliz Öyküleri (Psychoanalytic Cases). Trans. B. Ceyhun. Ankara: Bilimsel Tıp Yayınevi.
- (1997). Volkan, V. D., Bloodlines: From Ethnic Pride to Ethnic Terrorism. New York: Farrar, Straus and Giroux. (German edition: Bluts-Grenzen: Die historischen Wurzeln und die psychologischen Mechanismen ethnischer Konflikte und ihre Bedeutung bei Friedensverhandlungen. (Bloodlines) Trans. K. Kochmann. Zurich: Scherz Verlag.2000; Japanese edition:. Tokyo: K.K. Kyod. 1998; and Turkish edition: Kanbağı: Etnik Gururdan Etnik Teröre. Istanbul: Bağlam Yayınevi. 2000).
- (1997). Volkan, V. D. & Ast, G., Siblings in the Unconscious and Psychopathology: Womb Fantasies, Claustrophobias, Fear of Pregnancy, Murderous Rage, Animal Symbolism, Christmas and Easter "Neuroses" and Twinings or Identifications with Sisters and Brothers. Madison, CT: International Universities Press.(Turkish Edition: Bilinçdışında Kardeşler ve Psikopatoloji. Trans. A. G. Ceyhun and B. Ceyhun. Ankara: Novartis, 1998).
- (1997). Volkan, V. D., Itzkowitz, N. & Dod, A., Richard Nixon: A Psychobiography. New York, NY: Columbia University Press.
- (1997). Volkan, V. D. & Akhtar, S., The Seed of Madness: Constitution, Maternal Environment, and Fantasy in the Organization of the Psychotic Core. Madison, CT: International Universities Press.
- (1999). Volkan, V. D., Das Versagen der Diplomatie: Zur Psychoanalyse Nationaler, Ethnischer und Religiöser Konflikte. (The Failure of Diplomacy: The Psychoanalysis of National, Ethnic and Religious Conflicts.) Giessen: Psychosozial-Verlag.
- (2002). Volkan, V. D., Ast, G. & Greer, W. F., Third Reich in the Unconscious: Transgenerational Transmission and Its Consequences. New York: Brunner-Routledge (Foreword by I. Brenner).
- (2002). Volkan, V. D., Kozmik Kahkaha (Cosmic Laughter). Istanbul: OkuyanUs.
- (2003). Volkan, V.D., Atlarla Yaşıyan Kadın (The Woman who Lived with Horses). Istanbul: OkuyanUs.(Finnish edition:. Hevosnainen: Psychoanalyyttinen tapausselostus Therapeia-Säätio. 2010).
- (2003). Varvin, S. & Volkan, V. D. (Eds.), Violence or Dialogue: Psychoanalytic Insights on Terror and Terrorism. London: International Psychoanalytical Association. (Italian edition: Violenza o Dialogo? Insight psicoanalitico su terrore e terrorism. Rome: Edizioni Borla s.r.2006.; also in Spanish and in Portuguese).
- (2004). Akhtar, S.& Volkan, V. D. (Eds.), Cultural Zoo: Animals in the Human Mind and its Sublimations. Madison, CT: International Universities Press. (London: Karnac, 2014).
- (2004). Akhtar, S. & Volkan, V. D. (Eds.), Mental Zoo: Animals in the Human Mind and Its Pathology. Madison, CT: International Universities Press. (London:Karnac 2014).
- (2004). Volkan, V. D., Blind Trust: Large Groups and Their Leaders in Times of Crises and Terror. Charlottesville, Va: Pitchstone Publishing.(German edition: Blindes Vertrauen: Grossgruppen und ihre Führer in Kriesezeiten. Giessen: Psychosozial-Verlag. 2005; Turkish edition) Körü Körüne İnanç. Istanbul: OkuyanUs Yayınevi. 2005.
- (2006, 2019). Volkan, V.D., Killing in the Name of Identity: A Study of Bloody Conflicts. Charlottesville, VA: Pitchstone Publishing. (Turkish edition: Kimlik Adına Öldürmek: Kanlı Çatışmalar Üzerine Bir İnceleme. Trans. B. Büyükkal. Istanbul: Alfa. 2007).
- (2008). Carter, J., Irani, G. & Volkan, V. D. (Eds.), Perspectives From the Front Lines: A Workbook of Ethnopolitical Conflict. New York: Prentice-Hill.
- (2009). Volkan, V. D. with J. C. Fowler, Searching for a Perfect Woman: The Story of a Complete Psychoanalysis. New York: Jason Aronson. (Finnish edition: Haussa täydellinen nainen. Therapeia-Säätiö, Vanta. 2005; Turkish Edition) Kusursuz Kadının Peșinde. Istanbul: OkuyanUs. 2013).
- (2009). Volkan, V. D., Fanustaki İnsanlar (People in Glass Bubbles). Trans. S. Erdogan. Istanbul: Everest.
- (2010). Volkan, V. D., Divanda Kılıç Dövüșü (Sword fight on the Couch). Trans. B. Büyükkal. Istanbul: Istanbul Bilgi Universitesi Yayınları.
- (2010). Volkan, V. D. & Atabey, N., Osmanlı’nın Yasından Atatürk’un Türkiye’sine: Onarıcı Liderlik ve Politik Psikoloji (From the Ottomans' Mourning to Atatürk's Turkey: Reparative Leadership and Political Psychology). Ankara: Kripto.
- (2010). Volkan, V. D. &. Itzkowitz, N., Atatürk/Anatürk: Mustafa Kemal’in Yaşamı, İç Dünyası, Yeni Türk Kimliğinin Yaratılışı ve Bugünkü Türkiye’deki Kimlik Sorunları (Father Turk/MotherTurk: The Life of Mustafa Kemal, His Internal World, the Creation of the New Turkish Identity and Identity Questions in Today's Turkey). Istanbul: Alfa.
- (2010). Volkan, V. D., Psychoanalytic Technique Expanded: A Textbook on Psychoanalytic Treatment. Istanbul/London: Oa Press. (German Edition: Die Erweiterung der psycho-analytischen Behandlungstechnik: bei neurotischen, traumatisierten, narzisstischen und Borderline-Persönlichkeiitsorganisationen. Trans. G. Ast. Giessen: Psychosozial-Verlag. 2012; Russian Edition: St. Petersburg: ECPP. 2012).
- (2012). Volkan, V.D., Psychoanalytic Process from Its Beginning to its Termination (E-book). Chevy Chase, MD: International Psychotherapy Institute E-Books.
- (2013). Volkan, V. D., Psicología de las Sociedades en Conflicto: Psicoanálisis, Relaciones Internacioales y Diplomacia. Libro de Consulta Sobre La Psicologia de los Grupos Grandes. Barcelona: Herder.
- (2013). Volkan, V. D., Enemies on the Couch: A Psychopolitical Journey Through War and Peace. Durham, NC: Pitchstone Publishing. (Turkish Edition:) Divandaki Düșmanlar: Bir Türk Psikoanalistin Siyaset Psikolojisi Serüveni. Trans. S. Erdoğan. Istanbul: Alfa. 2013).
- (2014). Volkan, V. D., Animal Killer: Transmission of War Trauma from One Generation to the Next. London: Karnac. (Turkish Edition: Hayvan Katili. Savaş Travmasinin Nesilden Nesile Geçisi Istanbul: OkuyanUs. 2014).
- (2014). Volkan, V. D., Psychoanalysis, International Relations, and Diplomacy: A Sourcebook on Large-Group Psychology. London: Karnac.
- (2015). Volkan, V.D., Would-Be Wife Killer: A Clinical Study of Primitive Mental Functions, Actualized Unconscious Fantasies, Satellite States, and Developmental Steps. London: Karnac.(Turkish Edition: Izmir, Turkey: Odağ Yayınevi)
- (2015). Volkan, V. D., A Nazi Legacy: A Study of Depositing, Transgenerational Transmission, Dissociation and Remembering Through Action. (Foreword by Emily Kuriloff). London: Karnac. (Finnish edition: Natsismin Perintö: Tallentaminen, ylisukupolvisuus, disosiaatio ja toiminnan kautta muistaminen. Helsinki: Therapeia-säatiö; Turkish edition: Nazi Mirası: Depolama, Nesiller Arası Aktarım, Disosiasyon ve Eylem Yoluyla Hatırlama. Ankara: Pusula).
- (2017). Volkan, V. D., Immigrants and Refugees: Trauma, Perennial Mourning, and Border Psychology. London: Karnac. (Turkish edition: Göçmenler ve Mülteciler: Travma, Sürekli Yas, Önyargı ve Sınır Psikolojisi, Ankara: Pusula, 2017).
- (2017). Suistola, J. & Volkan, V.D., Religious Knives: Historical and Psychological Dimensions of International Terrorism. Durham, N. C.: Pitchstone. (Turkish edition: Ankara: Pusula).
- (2019). Volkan, V. D., A Study of Ghosts in the Human Psyche: Story of a Muslim Armenian. UK: Karnac Books.
- (2020). Volkan, V. D. Large-Group psychology: Racism, Societal Divisions, Narcissistic Leaders and Who We Are Now. UK: Karnac Books. (Taiwan Edition, translated by Cheng Hao, PsyGarden Press {in press}]
- (2020). Hamburger, A., Hancheva, C. & Volkan, V. D. (Eds)., Social Trauma: An Interdisciplinary Textbook. London: Springer. (also in German).
- (2021). Volkan, V. D. Sexual Addiction and Hunger for Maternal Care: Psychoanalytic Concepts and the Art of Supervision. UK: Karnac Books.
- (2022). Volkan, K. & Volkan. V. D. Schizophrenia: Science, Psychoanalysis, and Culture. UK: Karnac Books.
- (2022). Volkan, V. D. Therapeutic Approaches to Varied Psychoanalytic Cases. Translated by Cheng Hao. Taiwan: PsyGarden Publishing.(Also published by Chongqing University Press, Chongqing, People's Republic of China).
- (2023). Volkan, V. D., Scholz, R. and Fromm, M. G. We Don't Speak of Fear: Large Group Identity, Societal Conflict and Collective Trauma. UK: Karnac Books.
- (2023). Volkan, V. D. Volkan, V. D. (2023). İç Dünyamıza Bakış (A look at Our Internal World). Istanbul: Destek
- Volkan, K. & Volkan, V. D. (2023). How the Mind Works: Concepts and Cases in Psychoanalysis and Psychoanalytic Psychotherapy. UK: Karnac Books.
- Volkan, V. D. (2024). Dışdünyamıza Bakış (A Look Our External World). Translated by Anjelika Şimşek and Serap Erdoğan Taycan. Istanbul: Destek.
- Volkan, V. D. & Volkan, K. (2025). Human Aggression, War, and Genocide. Durham, NC: Pitchstone.
- Volkan, V. D. & Vahip, I. (2025- in press).Psikanalitik Tedavinin Temel Kavramlarına Bakış (A Look at Basic Concepts related to Psychoanalytic Treatment). Istanbul: Destek.
- Volkan, V. D. (2025). Linking Objects and Linking Phenomena. UK: Karnac Books.

=== Articles (selected) ===
- (1962). Volkan, V. D., Sleep – A bibliographical study. British Journal of Medical Psychology, 35:235–244.
- (1963). Volkan, V. D., Five poems by negro youngsters who faced a sudden desegregation. Psychiatric Quarterly, 37:607-616. (In Italian: in Il Cimento Letterario, April 1965.
- (1965). Volkan, V. D., The observation and topographic study of the changing ego states of a schizophrenic Patient. British Journal of Medical Psychology, 37:239–311.
- (1965). Volkan, V. D., The Observation of the "Little Man" Phenomenon in a case of anorexia nervosa. British Journal of Medical Psychology, 38:299–311.
- (1966). Volkan, V. D., Normal pathological grief reactions. Virginia Medical Monthly, 93:651–656.
- (1968). Volkan, V. D., The Introjection of and identification with the therapist as an ego-building aspect in the treatment of schizophrenia. British Journal of Medical Psychology, 41:369–380.
- (1968). Volkan, V. D. & Wiley, W. A., A Descriptive study of a psychiatric ward in a general hospital, Virginia Medical Monthly, 96:457–464.
- (1968). Volkan, V. D., & Corney, R. T., Some considerations of satellite states and satellite dreams. British Journal of Medical Psychology, 41:282–290.
- (1970). Volkan, V. D., Typical findings in pathological grief. Psychiatric Quarterly, 44:231–250.
- (1971). Volkan, V. D., and Luttrell, A. S. Aspects of the object relationships and developing skills of a "Mechanical Boy." British Journal of Medical Psychology, 44:101–116.
- (1971). Volkan, V. D., A study of a patient's "Re-grief Work" through dreams, psychological tests and psychoanalysis. Psychiatric Quarterly, 45:255–273.
- (1971). Öztürk, O. M. and Volkan, V. D., The theory and practice of psychiatry in Turkey. American Journal of Psychotherapy, 25:240–271.
- (1971). Volkan, V.D. and Hawkins, D. R., A Fieldwork Case in the teaching of clinical psychiatry. Psychiatry in Medicine, 2:160–176.
- (1971). Volkan, V. D. and Hawkins, D R., The "Fieldwork" Method. Comprehensive Psychiatry, 12:103–115.
- (1972). Volkan, V. D., Discussion of Myron G. Sandifer's Paper, "Science and Set in Treatment Decisions." The American Journal of Psychiatry, 128: 1143–1144.
- (1972). Hawkins, D. R. and Volkan, V.D. (1972). Psychiatry in pre-baccalaureate education. Journal of Medical Education, 47: 810–816.
- (1972). Volkan, V. D., The recognition and prevention of pathological grief. Virginia Medical Monthly, 99: 535–540.
- (1972). Volkan, V. D.,. The birds of Cyprus. American Journal of Psychotherapy, 26: 378–383.
- (1972) Volkan, V. D., 'The Linking Objects of Pathological Mourners', Archives of General Psychiatry 27, pp 215–21
- Volkan, V. D. (1973). Externalization among Cypriot Turks. World Journal of Psychosynthesis, 5: 24–30.
- Volkan, V. D. (1973). Transitional fantasies in the analysis of a narcissistic personality. Journal of the American Psychoanalytic Association, 21: 351–376.
- Volkan, V. D. (1973). Preoccupation with eating, dieting and weight control. Virginia Medical Monthly, 100: 935–941.
- (1973). Volkan, V. D. and Bhatti, T.H., Dreams of transsexuals awaiting surgery. Comprehensive Psychiatry, 14:269–279.
- (1974).Volkan, V. D., Food, body shape and sexuality. In Marital and Sexual Counseling in Medical Practice, ed. by D.W. Abse, L.M. Nash and L.M.R. Louden, Chapter 36, pp. 412–421. New York: Harper and Row.
- (1974).Volkan, V. D., Death, divorce and the physician. In Marital and Sexual Counseling in Medical Practice, ed. by D.W. Abse, L.M. Nash and L.M.R. Louden, Chapter 36, pp. 446–462. New York: Harper and Row.
- (1975). Volkan, V. D., More on re-grief therapy. Journal of Thanatology, 3:77–91.
- (1975).Volkan, V. D., Cilluffo, A.F. and Sarvay, T.L., Re-grief' therapy and the function of the linking object as a key to stimulate emotionality. In Emotional Flooding, ed. by Paul Olsen, Chapter 10, pp. 179–224. New York: Behavioral Publications.
- (1975).Volkan, V. D. The history of psychiatry in Turkey. In World History of Psychiatry, ed. by J.G. Howells, Chapter 17, pp. 383–397. New York: Brunner-Mazel.
- (1975).Volkan, V. D., Cosmic laughter: A study of primitive splitting. In Tactics and Techniques in Psychoanalytic Psychotherapy, Vol. 2, ed. by P.L. Giovacchini, A. Flarsheim and L.B. Boyer, pp. 425–440. New York: Jason Aronson.
- (1975).Volkan, V. D., Re-grief therapy. In Bereavement: Its Psycho-Social Aspects, ed. by B. Shoenbey, I. Gerber, A. Wiener, A.H. Kutsher, D. Peretz and A.C. Carry, Chapter 38, pp. 334–350. New York: Columbia University Press.
- (1975). Volkan, V. D. Tekrar matem tutma teadvisi. (Re-grief therapy.) Tip Dünyasi, 48:85–91.
- (1976).Volkan, V. D., Grief over death: Its complications. In Encyclopaedic Handbook of Medical Psychology, ed. by S. Krauss, pp. 211–212. London: Butterworths.
- (1976).Volkan, V. D., Schizophrenia: Primitive object relationships in treatment. In Encyclopaedic Handbook of Medical Psychology, ed. by S. Krauss, pp. 489–490. London: Butterworths.
- (1976).Özbek, A., and Volkan, V. D., Psychiatric problems of Satellite-Extended Families in Turkey. American Journal of Psychotherapy, 30:576–582.
- (1997) Öztürk, O.M. and Volkan, V. D., The theory and practice of psychiatry in Turkey. In Psychology and Near-Eastern Studies, ed. by L.C. Brown and N. Itzkowitz. Princeton, New Jersey: Princeton University Press.
- (1978).Volkan, V. D. and Kavanaugh, J. G., The cat people. In Between Fantasy and Reality: Transitional Phenomena and Objects, ed. S. Grolnick, L. Barkin, and Muensterberger, pp. 289–303. New York: Jason Aronson.
- (1978). Kavanaugh, J.G., and Volkan, V. D. Transsexualism and a new type of psychosurgery: Thoughts on MacVicar's Paper. International Journal of Psychoanalytic Psychotherapy, 7: 366–372.
- (1979).Volkan, V. D. and Akhtar, S., The symptoms of schizophrenia: Contributions of the structural theory and object relations theory. In Integrating Ego Psychology and Object Relations, ed. by L. Saretsky, G.D. Goldman and D.S. Milman, pp. 270–285. Dubuque, Iowa: Kendall/Hunt.
- (1979).Volkan, V. D., The glass bubble of a narcissistic patient. In Advances in Psychotherapy of the Borderline Patient, ed. by Joseph LeBoit and Attilio Capponi, pp. 405–431. New York: Jason Aronson.
- (1980).Volkan, V. D. and Josephthal, D., The treatment of established psychological mourners. In Specialized Techniques in Individual Psychotherapy, ed. by T.B. Karasu and L. Bellak, pp. 118–142. New York: Brunner/Mazel.
- (1980).Volkan, V. D., Narcissistic personality organization and "reparative" leadership. International Journal of Group Psychotherapy, 30:131–152
- (1981).Volkan, V .D., Transference and countertransference: An examination from the point of view of internalized object relations. In Object and Self: A Developmental Approach (Essays in Honor of Edith Jacobson), ed. by S. Tuttman, C. Kaye and M. Zimmerman, pp. 429–451. New York: International Universities Press.
- (1981).Volkan, V. D., The immortal Atatürk: Narcissism and creativity in a revolutionary leader. In Psychoanalytic Study of Society, Vol. 9, ed. by W. Muesterberger and L.B. Boyer, pp. 221–255. New York: The Psychohistory Press.
- (1981).Volkan, V. D., Identification and related psychic events: Their appearance in therapy and their curative values. In Curative Factors in Dynamic Psychotherapy, ed. by S. Slipp, pp. 153–176, New York: McGraw-Hill.
- (1982).Volkan, V. D., A young woman's inability to say no to needy people and her identification with the frustrator in the analytic situation. In Technical Factors in the Treatment of the Severely Disturbed Patient, ed. by Peter L. Giovacchini and L. Bryce Boyer, pp. 439–465, New York: Jason Aronson.
- (1982).Volkan, V. D., Narcissistic personality disorder. In Critical Problems in Psychiatry, ed. by Jesse O. Canevar, Jr.and H. Keith Brodie, pp. 332–350, Philadelphia: J.B. Lippincott.
- (1983).Volkan, V. D., Complicated mourning and the syndrome of established pathological mourning. In New Psychiatric Syndromes: DSM III and Beyond, ed. by S. Akhtar, pp. 71–91, New York: Jason Aronson.
- (1984).Volkan, V. D., A Message from the President. Political Psychology, 5:3-4. (1985). Volkan, V. D. The need to have enemies and allies: A Developmental Approach. Political Psychology, 2:219–247.
- (1985).Volkan, V. D., Becoming a psychoanalyst. In Analysts at Work: Practice, Principles and Techniques, ed. by Joseph Reppen, pp. 251–231, New York: The Analytic Press.
- (1985).Volkan, V. D., Complicated mourning. In Annual of Chicago Institute of Psychoanalysis, pp. 323–348.
- (1985).Volkan, V. D., (1985).Suitable targets for externalization and schizophrenia. In Towards a Comprehensive Model for Schizophrenic Disorders, ed. by D.B. Feinsilver, pp. 125–153, New York: The Analytic Press.
- (1987). Volkan, V. D., Psychological concepts useful in the building of political foundations between nations (Track II diplomacy.) Journal of the American Psychoanalytic Association, 35:903–935.
- (1988).Volkan, V. D., Six constellations of psychoanalytic psychotherapy of borderline patients. In The Borderline Patient, ed. by J.S. Grotstein, M. Solomon and J.A. Lang, Vol. 2, pp. 5–23, Hillsdale, New Jersey: The Analytic Press.
- 1988).Volkan, V. D., and Rodgers, T.C. Introduction. In Attitudes of Entitlement: Theoretical and Clinical Issues, ed. by V.D. Volkan and T.C. Rodgers, pp. vii-xi, Charlottesville, Virginia: The University Press of Virginia.
- (1989).Volkan. V.D., The need to have enemies and nuclear weapons: A psychoanalytic perspective. In Psychoanalysis and the Nuclear Threat: Clinical and Theoretical Studies, ed. by H.B. Levine, D. Jacobs and L.J. Rubin, New York: The Analytic Press.
- (1989).Volkan, V. D., Foreword. In Maps from the Mind: Readings in Psychogeography, ed. by H. Stein and W. Neiderland, Oklahoma City, Oklahoma: University of Oklahoma Press.
- (1989).Volkan, V. D., and Masri, A, The Development of female transsexualism. American Journal of Psychotherapy, 43:92–107.
- (1989).Volkan, V. D. and Çevik, A., Turkish fathers and their families. In Fathers and Their Families, ed. by S.H. Cath, A. Gurwitt and L. Gunsberg, Chapter 17, pp. 347–364, Hillsdale, New Jersey: The Analytic Press.
- (1989).Zuckerman, R. and Volkan, V. D., Complicated mourning over a body defect: The making of a 'living linking object.' In The Problem of Loss and Mourning: New Psychoanalytic Perspective, ed. by D. Dietrich and P. Shabad, New York: International Universities Press.
- (1989).Volkan, V. D., The psychoanalytic psychotherapy of schizophrenia. In Master Clinicians on Treating the Regressed Patient, ed. by L.B. Boyer and P.L. Giovachini, Chapter 10, pp. 245–270, Northvale, New Jersey: Jason Aronson.
- (1990).Volkan, V. D., Eine modifizierte psychoanalytische Technik bei der Behandlung der Borderline-Struktur. In Herausforderungen für die Psychoanalyse, ed. Ulrich Streeck/Hans-Volker Werthmann, pp. 87–122, München, Germany: Pfeiffer.
- (1990).Volkan, V. D., Living statues and political decision making. Mind and Human Interaction, 2: 3–4, 19–20.
- (1990).Volkan, V. D., Change, mourning, and reorganization in Moscow. Mind and Human Interaction, 2: 3–4, 19–20.
- (1990).Volkan, V. D., (1990). Duelo Complicado (Complicated Grief), Gradiva, 4: 47–72.
- (1990).Volkan, V. D., Interviews: Lithuanians in Finland. Mind and Human Interaction, 2: 16–17.
- (1991).Volkan, V. D., Why war? Revisited. Mind and Human Interaction, 2: 61–65. Reprinted in: Psychologist Psychoanalyst, 11: 9-13, (1991).
- (1991).Volkan, V. D., Interview with Valentin Berezhkov. Mind and Human Interaction, 2: 77–80.
- (1991).Volkan, V. D., The impact of political psychology on east–west relationships. Mind and Human Interaction, 2: 105–107.
- (1991).Volkan, V. D., On 'Chosen Trauma.' Mind and Human Interaction, 3: 13.
- (1992).Volkan, V. D., Nesne iliskileri kuramu ve psikosomatik Hastaliklar (Object relations theory and psychosomatic illnesses), in 1. Psikosomatik Sempozyum Bilimsel Yayinlari (Scientific Papers from the First Psychosomatic Symposium), ed. A. Çevik, pp. 1–44, Anatalya (Turkey): Roche.
- (1992).Volkan, V. D. and Itzkowitz, N., Istanbul, not Constantinople: The western world's view of 'The Turk.' Mind and Human Interaction, 4: 129–134.
- (1992).Volkan, V. D. and Harris, M., Negotiating a peaceful separation: A psychopolitical analysis of current relationships between Russia and the Baltic Republics. Mind and Human Interaction, 4: 20–39.
- (1992).Volkan, V.D. Was der Holocaust für einen nichtjüdischen Psychoanalytiker ohne Nazi-Erfahrung bedeutet (What Holocaust means to a psychoanalyst who was not directly involved in it) in Die Bedeutung des Holocaust für nicht direkt Betroffene, ed. by Rafael Moses and Friedrick-Wilhelm Eickhoff, pp. 107–150, Stuttgart (Germany): Frommann-Holzboog.
- (1992).Volkan, V. D., Ethnonationalistic rituals: An introduction. Mind and Human Interaction, 4: 3–19.
- (1992).Volkan, V. D., Kedisiz yapamayan insanlar: Psikoanalitik bir yorum. (Those who need to have cats: A psychoanalytic interpretation). Psikiyatri Bülteni. 1: 5–9.
- (1992).Volkan, V. D., The dilemma of Moscow: To change or not to change. Mind and Human Interaction, 3: 49–52.
- (1993).Volkan, V. D., Immigrants and refugees: A psychodynamic perspective. Mind and Human Interaction, 4: 63–69.
- (1993).Volkan, V. D. and Harris, M., Vaccinating the political process: A second psychopolitical analysis of relationships between Russia and the Baltic Republics. Mind and Human Interaction, 4: 20–39.
- (1993).Volkan, V. D., Ciprus—Háború és Alkalmazkodá. Korunk, 4: 59–63.
- (1993).Volkan, V. D. and Harris, Max, Rázva az Etnikum Sátrát: az Etnikai Terrorizmus Pszichodianamikája. Korunk, 4: 85–90.
- (1994).Volkan, V. D., Identification with the therapist's functions and ego-building in the treatment of schizophrenia. British Journal of Psychiatry, 164 (suppl. 23):80–86.
- (1994).Volkan, V. D., Psychodynamic formulations for psychotherapy of schizophrenic patients. In: Directions in Psychiatry (special issue).
- (1995).Volkan, V. D., Über die Notwendigkeit, Feinde und Verbündete zu haben, Die Zukunft Der Psychoanalyse. 3: 69–83
- (1995).Volkan, V. D., Totem and taboo in Romania: A psychopolitical diagnosis. Mind and Human Interaction, 6: 66–85.
- (1995).Volkan, V. D. and van Waning, A., Vamık Volkan talks to Adeline van Waning. Free Associations. 5: 3, 261–274.
- (1995).Volkan, V. D., and Harris, M. The psychodynamics of ethnic terrorism. International Journal on Group Rights, 3: 145–159.
- (1995).Thomson, J. A.; Harris, M.; Volkan, V. D. and Edwards, B., The psychology of Western European neo-racism. International Journal on Group Rights, 3: 1–30.
- (1996).Volkan, V. D., Bosnia-Herzegovina: Ancient fuel of a modern inferno. Mind and Human Interaction, 7:110–127.
- (1997) Volkan, V. D., A methodology for integrating information in a psychoanalytic biography. Mind and Human Interaction, 8: 82–100.
- (1998).Volkan, V. D., Ethnicity and nationalism: A psychoanalytic perspective. Applied Psychology, 47: 45–57.
- (1988).Volkan, V. D., A psychoanalytic perspective on intergroup hatred. Journal for the Psychoanalysis of Culture and Society, 3: 78–80.
- (1999) Volkan, V. D., Post-traumatic states: Beyond individual PTSD in societies ravaged by ethnic conflict. La Politique étrangére du Canada, Vol. 7, 1: 27–38.
- (1999).Volkan, V. D., Psychoanalysis and diplomacy Part I: Individual and large-group identity. Journal of Applied Psychoanalytic Studies, 1: 29–55.
- (1999).Volkan, V.D., Psychoanalysis and diplomacy Part II: Large-group rituals. Journal of Applied Psychoanalytic Studies, 1: 223–247.
- (1999).Volkan, V. D., Psychoanalysis and diplomacy part III: Potentials for and obstacles against collaboration. Journal of Applied Psychoanalytic Studies, 1: 305–318.
- (1999).Volkan, V. D., Nostalgia as a linking phenomenon. Journal of Applied Psychoanalytic Studies, 1: 169–179.
- (1999).Volkan, V. D., Akhtar, S., Dorn, R. M.; Kafka, J. S., Kernberg, O. F., Olsson, Peter, A. and Rogers, R. R., Psychodynamics of leaders and decision-making. Mind and Human Interaction, 9: 129–181.
- (1999).Volkan, V. D., Post-traumatic states: Beyond individual PTSD in societies ravaged by ethnic conflict. La Politique étrangére du Canada, Vol. 7, 1: 27–38.
- (1999).Volkan, V.D., The Tree Model: A comprehensive psychopolitical approach to unofficial diplomacy and the reduction of ethnic tension. Mind and Human Interaction, 10: 142–210.
- (1999).Volkan, V. D., When enemies talk: psychoanalytic insights from Arab-Israeli dialogues. Sigmund Freud Society's newsletter, 1:11–24.
- (1999).Volkan, V.D., Individual and large-group identity: Parallels in development and characteristics in stability and crisis. Croatian Medical Journal, 40: 458–465.
- (1999).Volkan, V.D., Diplomacy and Psychoanalysis: A Psychoanalyst's View. In En El Umbral Del Milenio (At the Threshold of the Millennium), Vol. II, ed. M.R.F. Bresein and M. Lemlig, pp. 158–163. Lima, Perú: Sidea and Prom.
- (2000).Saunders, H. H.; Diamond L.; Herbert C.; Kelman, M., John; Montville, V.; and Volkan V.D., Interactive conflict resolution: A view for policymakers on making and building peace. In: International Conflict Resolution After the Cold War, In: (Eds.), P. C. Stern, and D. Druckman (Eds), pp. 251–293. Washington, DC.: National Academy Press.
- (2000).Volkan, V.D., Layers upon layers: Politics, psychology, and language in a changing world. In Step-Mothertongue: From Nationalism to Multiculturalism: Literatures of Cyprus, Greece and Turkey, (ed.) N. Yashin, pp. 180–196. London: Middlesex University Press.
- (2000). Volkan, V. D., Traumatized societies and psychological care: Expanding the concept of preventive medicine. Mind and Human Interaction, 11:177–194.
- (2000).Volkan, V. D., Borderline-Psychopathologie und internationale Beziehungen (Borderline Psychopathology and International Relations). In Handbuch der Borderline-Störungen, ed. by Otto F. Kernberg, Birger Dulz, Ulrich Sachsse, pp. 819–828. Stuttgart: Schattauer Press.
- (2000).Volkan, V. D., Grobgruppenidentität und auserwahltes Trauma, Psyche, (in German), Sept/Oct.: pp. 931–953. Jahrgang: Klett-Cotta.
- (2000). Volkan, V. D., Wenn Feinde Redden: Psychoanalytische Erkenntnisse Aus Arabish-Israelishen Gesprachen, In Korruption, Reziprozitat und Recht, eds. R. Jacob & W. Fikentscher, 85–97. Bern: Stampfli Verlag.
- (2001). Volkan, V. D., Slike Neprijatelja–Male Razlike i Dehumanizacija (Enemy Images: Minor Differences and Dehumanization.) In Psihoanaliza i Rat (Psychoanalysis and War), eds Ž. Martinović & M. Martinović, pp. 113–123. Belgrade: Norveško Lekarsko Društvo.
- (2001). Volkan, V. D., Getraumatiseerde Samenlevingen en Psychologische Zorg. In Over een Grens: Psychotherapie met Adolescenten, eds C.J.A. Roosen, A. Savenjie, A. Kolman & R. Beunderman, pp. 3–19. Assen, Netherlands: Koninklijke Van Gorcum.
- (2001).Volkan, V. D., Transgenerational transmissions and chosen traumas: An aspect of large-groupidentity. Group Analysis, 34:79–97.
- (2001).Volkan, V. D., Foreword: In Forensic Psychotherapy and Psychopathology: Winnicottian Perspectives, (ed.), Brett Kahr, xix-xxiv. London: Karnac Books.
- (2001).Volkan, V. D., Slike Neprijatelja–Male Razlike i Dehumanizacija (Enemy Images: Minor Differences and Dehumanization.) (Eds.), Ž. Martinović, and M. Martinović. In Psihoanaliza i Rat (Psychoanalysis and War), 113–123. Belgrade: Norveško Lekarsko Društvo.
- (2001).Volkan, V. D., Psychoanalysis and diplomacy: Potentials for and obstacles against collaboration. (Ed.), D. E. Scharff. In The Psychoanalytic Century: Freud's Legacy for the Future, 279–296. New York: Other Press.
- (2002).Volkan, V. D., Nach der Vertreibung: Eine Fluchtlingsfamilie Von Innen Betrachet. (Eds.), Anne-Marie Schlosser, und Alf Gerlach. In: Gewald und Zivilisation, 183–212. Giessen: Psychosozial-Verlag.
- (2002). Volkan, V. D., Bosnia-Herzegovina: Chosen Trauma and Its Transgenerational Transmission. (Ed.), Maya Shatzmiller, In Islam and Bosnia: Conflict Resolution and Foreign Policy in Multi-Ethnic States, 86–97. Montreal: McGill-Quenn's University Press.
- (2002). Volkan, V. D. (2002.) Vorwort: In Identitatsverlust—Migration und Verfolgung, Migration und Verfolgung Psychoanalytishce Perspektiven, 13–36. Giessen: Psychosozial-Verlag.
- (2002).Volkan, V.D., Religiöser Fundamentalismus und Gewalt. In Gewalt und Zivilisation (Violence and Civilization). Ed. A. M. Schlösser and A. Gerlach. Gieben: Psychosozial-Verlag.
- (2002). Volkan, V. D., Vorwort: In Identitatsverlust—Migration und Verfolgung, Migration und Verfolgung Psychoanalytishce Perspektiven, 13–36. Giessen: Psychosozial-Verlag.
- (2002). Volkan, V. D., Ethnopsychoanaytische Aspecte der Menschichen Identitat. In Entgrenzung, Spaltung, Integration, eds G. Schlesinger-Kipp & R-P Warsitz pp. 39–56. Bad Hamburg: Geber und Reusch.
- (2003). Volkan, V. D., In Die Innere Welt des Fundamentalisten/Terroristen: Die "Ausbildung" Mittelostlicsher Selbtmordattentater, eds T. Auchter, C. Buttner, U. Schultz-Venrath & H-J Wirth, pp. 259–265. Giessen: Psychosozial-Verlag.
- (2003). Volkan, V. D., Generationenubergreifende Weitergabe Gewahlter Traumata: In Ein Aspeckt von Grossgruppenidentitat, pp. 225–248. Heidelberg: Carl-Auer-Systeme Verlag.
- (2003).Volkan, V.D., Foreword: In Israel on the Couch by Ofer Grosbard, pp.ix-xi. New York: State University of New York Press.
- (2004).Volkan, V. D., From hope for a better life to broken spirits. In Broken Spirits: The Treatment of Traumatized Asylum Seekers, Refugees, War and Torture Victims, (Eds.), J. B. Wilson, and B.Drozdek, pp. 7–12. New York: Brunner-Routledge
- (2004).Volkan, V. D., Actualized unconscious fantasies and "therapeutic play" in adults' analyses: Further study of these concepts. In Power of Understanding: Essays in Honour of Veikko Tähkä, ed. Aira Laine, pp. 119–141. London: Karnac Books.
- (2004).Volkan, V. D., After the violence: The internal world and linking objects of a refugee family. In Analysts in the Trenches, ed. B. Sklarew, S. W. Twemlow and S. M. Wilkinson, pp. 77–102. Hillside, NJ: The Analytic Press.
- (2004).Volkan, V. D., From hope for a better life to broken spirits. In Broken Spirits: The Treatment of Traumatized Asylum Seekers, Refugees, War and Torture Victims, ed. J. B. Wilson and B. Drozdek, pp. 7–12. New York: Brunner-Routledge.
- (2005). Volkan, V. D., Psychoanalyse in internationale Beiehungen und internationale Beziehungen in der Psychoanalyse. In WIR: Psychotheraputen uber sich und ihren "unmoglichen" Beruf, eds. O. F. Kernberg, B. Dulz and J. Eckert, pp. 545–562. Stuttgart, Germany: Schattauer.
- (2006). Volkan, V. D., Aufgeklärte Beschneidung. Die Psychoanalyse erreicht in der Türkei nur jene, in deren Alltag die Religion keine Rolle spielt – die Tradition aber sehr wohl. Die Zeit, 18 Mai, 38.
- (2006). Volkan, V. D., Grossgruppen und ihre politischen Fürer mit narzisstischer Personlichkeitsorganisation. In Narzissmus: Grunlagen-Stőrungsbilder –Therapie, eds. O. F. Kernberg & H-P. Hartmann, pp. 205–227. Stuttgart, Germany: Schattauer.
- (2006). Volkan, V. D., Large-group identity, large-group regression and massive violence. Group-Analytic Contexts, 30:8–26.
- (2006). Volkan, V. D., Large-group psychodynamics and massive violence. Matrix: Nordisk Tidsskrift for Psykoterapi, 23:95-114. (Norway)
- (2006). Volkan, V. D., Psikodinâmica da violência de grandes grupas e da violência de massas (Large-group psychodynamics and massive violence). Ciência & Saúde Coletiva, 11:303- 314.
- (2006). Volkan, V. D., Slobodan Milošević and the Serbian chosen trauma. Clio's Psyche, 13: 1, 19–22.
- (2006). Volkan, V. D., What some monuments tell us about mourning and forgiveness. In Taking Wrongs Seriously: Apologies and Reconciliation, eds. E. Barkan & A. Karn, pp. 115–131. Stanford, CA: Stanford University Press.
- (2006). Volkan, V. D. & Kayatekin, S., Extreme religious fundamentalism and violence: Some psychoanalytic and psychopolitical thoughts. Psyche & Geloof: 17:71-91, Holland.
- (2006). Volkan, V. D., & Kayatekin, S. Extreme religious fundamentalism and violence: Some psychoanalytic and psychopolitical thoughts. In Social Dynamics of Global Terrorism and Preventive Policies, pp. 254–286. Ankara, Turkey: Sosyoloji Derneği.
- (2007). Volkan, V. D., Şizofrenin oluşumu üzerine yazışlar 1: Infantil psikotik kendilik ve şizofrenin oluşumu (Essays on the development of schizophrenia 1: Infantile psychotic self and the development of schizophrenia). Trans. by A. A. Köşkdere. In Psikoanaliz ve Sinirbilim, ed. M. Özmen. Istanbul, Turkey: Turgut.
- (2007). Volkan, V. D., Le trauma massif: l'idélogie politique du droit et de la violence. Revue Française de Psychoanalyse, 4: 1041- 1059. (France)
- (2007). Volkan, V. D. On Kemal Atatürk's psychoanalytic Biography. International Journal of Turkish Studies, Fall: 229-241
- (2007). Volkan, V. D., De Waco al Valle de Bamian: regresión y fundemantelismo religioso. In Estudios Clínicos Sobre Sectas, ed. M. Perlado. Barcelona, Spain: AIS.
- (2007). Volkan, V. D. & Greer, W. F., Sukupolvien perintö: sukupolvien psykologiset taakat. In Vieraiden ääniä: Suomen nuorisopsykiatrisen yhdistyksen 30-vuotisjuhlakirja, eds. Irja Kantanen and Veikko Aalberg. Helsinki, Finland: Suomen Nuorisopsykiatrinen Yhdistys Ry.
- (2008).Volkan, V. D., On Kemal Atatűrk's psychoanalytic biography. In Identity and Identity Formation in the Ottoman World: A Volume of Essays in Honor of Norman Itzkowitz, eds. B. Tezcan & K. K. Babir. Madison: University of Wisconsin Press.
- (2008).Volkan, V. D., Kayba tutunup kalmak: Kronik yas tutan bireylerden hak iddiasinda bulunan ideojilere tutunan toplumlara (Fixation in mourning: From individuals suffering from perennial mourning to societies with entitlement ideologies). In Psikoanalitik Bakışlar III: Kayıp Nesne (Psychoanalytic Perspectives III: Lost Object), ed. N. Erdem, pp. 73–91. Istanbul, Turkey: PPPD Yayıınları.
- (2008).Volkan, V. D., Trauma, identity and search for a solution in Cyprus. Insight Turkey, 10: 95–110.
- (2008).Volkan, V. D., Traumas masivos causados por los "otros": Problemas de identitad en grandes grupos, transmisión generacional, "traumas elegidos" y sus consecuencias (Massive Traumas at the hand of "Others": Large-group identity issues, transgenerational transmissions, "chosen traumas" and their consequences). In Los Laberintos de la Violencia, ed. L. G. Fioroni, pp. 153–172. Buenos Aires: Lugar Editorial.
- (2008).Volkan, V. D., Identità, large group e trauma scelto: dalla rimozione degli ostacoli alla collaborazione tra psicoanalisi e diplomazla. Quaderni de gli argonauti, 8: 65–76.
- (2009).Volkan, V. D., Las identidades individual y de grupo grande; el trabajo con pacientes límite (Bordeline) Nos ensańa algo sobre negociaciones internatioonales? Revista de Psicoterapia Analítica Grupal, Seperata, 5: 3–35.
- (2009).Volkan, V. D., Large-group identity: "Us and them" polarizations in the international arena. Psychoanalysis, Culture and Society, 14: 4–15.
- (2009).Volkan, V. D., The next chapter: Consequences of societal trauma. In Memory, Narrative and Forgiveness: Perspectives of the Unfinished Journeys of the Past, eds. P. Gobodo-Madikizela & C. van der Merve, pp. 1–26. Cambridge: Cambridge Scholars Publishing.
- (2009).Volkan, V. D. Religious fundamentalism and violence. In On Freud's Illusion, eds. M. K. O'Neil & S. Akhtar, pp. 123–141. London: Karnac.
- (2009). Volkan, V. D., Some psychoanalytic views on leaders with narcissistic personality organization and their roles in large-group processes. In Leadership in a Changing World: Dynamic Perspectives on Groups and Their Leaders, eds. R. H. Klein, C. A. Rice &V. L. Schermer. pp. 67–89. New York: Lexington.
- (2009).Volkan, V. D., Kürt sorununun çözüm modeli (A model for resolving the Kurdish question). In Sürec: Kürt Sorununda 29 Temmuz Sonrası Tartıșmalar (The Process: Discussions on the Kurdish Question After July 29), ed. D. Sevimay, pp. 156–162. Istanbul, Turkey: Özgür Yayınları.
- (2009). Volkan, V.D. & Fowler, J. C., Large-group narcissism and political leaders with narcissistic personality organization. Psychiatric Annals, 39: 214–222.
- (2010).Volkan, V. D., President's notes. American College of Psychoanalysts Newsletter. Spring Issue: 1–2.
- (2010).Volkan, V. D., İntihar bombacıları (Suicide bombers). Akademik Orta Doğu, Vol 4- Number 2: 1–8.
- (2010).Volkan, V. D,. Psychoanalytic considerations on large-group psychology. American College of Psychoanalysts Newsletter. Spring Issue: 4–6.
- (2010).Volkan, V. D., Individual and large-group identities: Does working with borderline patients teach us anything about international negotiations? In The Psychoanalytic Therapy of Severe Disturbance: Psychoanalytic Ideas, ed. P. Williams, pp. 185–221. London: Karnac.
- (2010).Volkan, V. D., Büyük grup kimliği ve șiddet. (Large-group identity and violence) In Terorün Sosyal Psikolojisi, eds. M. Sever, H. Cinoğlu & O. Bașıbüyük, pp. 17–24. Ankara, Turkey: Polis Akademisi Yayınları.
- (2010).Volkan, V. D., Foreword. In Revenge or Restoration by T. Böhm & S. Kaplan. London: Karnac.
- (2010).Volkan, V. D., Psychoanalysis and international relationships: Large-group identity, traumas at the hand of "others," and transgenerational transmission of trauma. In Psychoanalytic Perspectives on a Turbulent World, eds. H. Brunning & M. Perini, pp. 41–62. London: Karnac.
- (2010). El trauma masivo causado por el enemigo: su influencia en la identidad del grupo grande y sus consecuencias políticas y socials. Átopos, 9: 7–18.
- (2010).Volkan, V. D., Further notes on psychoanalytic considerations on large-group psychology. American College of Psychoanalysts Newsletter. Fall Issue: 4–7.
- (2010).Volkan, V. D., Vamik Volkanin muistelo. (Vamık Volkan's memories) In Turun Psykoterapiayhdistys Ry 40 vuotta: Historiikki, pp. 32–34. Turku, Finland.
- (2011)Volkan, V. D., Vamık Volkan's speech. In Building Cultures of Peace, eds. J. Höck, A. Begert, M. Kappmeier & A. Redlich, pp. 28–42. Frankfurt, Germany: Peter Lang.
- (2011). Volkan, V. D., Die Identität von Individuen von Großgruppen – was können wir aus der Arbeit mit Borderline-Patienten über internationale Verhandlungen lernen? Trans. C. Campisi, In Handbuch der Borderline-Störungen, eds. B. Dulz, S. C. Herpertz, O. F. Kernberg & U. Sachsse, pp. 235–250. Stuttgart, Germany: Schattauer.
- (2011). The psychology of politics. Refugee Transitions, 25:37-43, Australia.
- (2011).Volkan, V. D., Psychoanalysis, Turkey and the IPA. In 100 Years of the IPA: The Centenary History of the International Psychoanalytic Association- Evolution and Change, eds. P. Loewenberg & N. L. Thomson, pp. 419–434. London: Karnac.
- (2012).Volkan, V. D., The intertwining of the internal and external wars. In Lost in Transmission: Studies of Trauma Across Generations, ed. G. Fromm, pp. 75–97. London: Karnac.
- (2012). Volkan, V. D. & Fowler, J. C, Large-scale voter behavior. International Journal of Group Psychotherapy, 62: 121–128.
- (2012).Volkan, V. D., Some thoughts on political psychology. In New World Order, Arab Spring and Turkey, eds. B S. Çevik-Ersaydı & B. S. Baskak, pp. 21–28. Ankara, Turkey: Ankara University Press.
- (2012). Volkan, V. D., Politik psikoloji üzerine bir değerlendirme. In Yeni Dünya Düzeni, Arap Baharı ve Türkiye, eds. B. S. Çevik-Ersaydı and B. Baskak, pp. 19–26. Ankara: Ankara University Press.
- (2012). Volkan, V. D., Zypern auf der Couch: Konfliktbewältigung mit dem Psychiater Dr. Vamık D. Volkan by Rebecca Donauer. ARTE Journal, June 6.
- (2013). Volkan, V. D., Geniș grup kimliği ve barıș sağlama üzerine bazı düșünceler (Large-group identity and some thoughts on finding peaceful solutions). 21. Yüzyilda Sosyal Bilimler, 2: 9–36.
- (2013). Volkan, V. D., My psychopolitical journey. The American Psychoanalyst, 47:2, pp. 9, 29–30.
- (2013). Volkan, V. D., Large-Group-Psychology in Its Own Right: Large-Group Identity and Peace-making. International Journal of Applied Psychoanalytic Studies 10: 210–246.
- (2013). Volkan, V. D., La identidad del grupo grande y el prejuicio compartido. Teoría y Práctica Groupoanalítica, 3 (Number 1): 29–44.
- (2014). Volkan, V. D., Father quest and linking objects: A story of the American World War II Orphans Network (AWON) and Palestinian orphans. In Healing in the Wake of Parental Loss: Clinical Applications and Therapeutic Strategies, eds. P. Cohen, M. Sossin & R. Ruth, pp. 283–300. New York: Jason Aronson.
- (2014). Volkan, V. D., Massive Trauma at the Hand of the Enemy, its influence on large-group identity and Its Societal and Political Consequences. ÁTOPOS magazine, Spain.
- (2014). Volkan, V. D., Foreword. In War Is Not Inevitable: "Why War" Revisited by H. Parens, pp. 1–13. Lantham, MD: Lexington Books.
- (2014). Volkan, V. D,. Psychoanalytic thoughts on international affairs. In Agrafa: Časopis za Filozofiju-Year II/3: Rat i Destrukcija (War and Destruction). Ed. S. Damnjanović pp. 8–28. Novi Sad, Serbia.
- (2014). Volkan, V. D., İkame çocukların psikolojisi ve Atatürk'ün yaratıcılığının temelindeki güdüleme (Psychology of replacement children and a main factor in Atatürk's creativity. In Kardeşi Anlatmak (On Siblings), ed. N. K. Bilen, pp. 37–52. Istanbul: Bilgi University Press.
- (2015).Volkan, V. D., International Relations and psychoanalysis. In Hostile and Malignant Prejudice: Psychoanalytic Approaches, ed. C. Levitt, pp. 57–83. London: Karnac.
- (2015). Volkan, V. D., Büyük Grup Kimliği ve Barışı Sağlama. In Siyaset Psikolojisi, Volume 1. Ed. O. D. Gümüş, pp. 91–108. Ankara, Turkey: Nobel.
- (2015). Volkan, V. D., Leer verschil te maken tussen realistische gevaren en ingebeelde angsten. In Biopolitiek: in de greep van angst. Christen Democratische Verkenningen, pp. 130–131.
- (2015). Volkan, V. D., (Book Review) Roots of the Arab Spring: Contested Authority and Political Change in the Middle East by Dafna Hochman Rand. Political Psychology, 36: 603–605.
- (2015). Volkan, V. D., Großgruppenidentität, schweres Trauma und seine gesellschftchen und politischen Kosequenzen. In Identitäten, eds. Susanne Walz-Pawlita, Beate Unruh and Bernard Janta, pp. 111–130. Giessen: Psychosozial-Verlag.
- (2015). Volkan, V. D., Not only Hitler was thinking of the new Turkey. Turkish Review, 5: 247–253.
- (2015). Volkan, V. D., Introduction: The Intertwining of External and Internal Events in the Changing World. In. V. D. Volkan (Guest Editor). Diamond Jubilee Special Issue- The American Journal of Psychoanalysis, 75: 353–360.
- (2016). Volkan, V. D., A Psychoanalytic Witness: Observations from North Carolina to Virginia. In The Key to the Door: Experiences of the Early African-American Graduates of the University of Virginia. Eds. M. Apprey and Shelli Poe. Charlottesville, VA: University of Virginia Press.
- (2016). Volkan, V. D., Large-Group Identity and Massive Trauma. In Psychoanalysis, Trauma, and Community: History and Contemporary Reappraisals, eds. Elizabeth Goren & Judie Alpert. New York: Routledge.
- (2016). Volkan, V. D., Guns and Violence in the International Arena. International Journal of Applied Psychoanalytic Studies, 13: 102–112.
- (2016). Volkan, V. & Fromm, M.G. We don't speak of fear". Georgetown Journal of International Affairs, 28 Jan.
- (2017). Volkan, V. D., From Earthquakes to ethnic cleansing: Societal responses to massive traumas. In Trauma, Trust, and Memory – Social Trauma and Reconciliation in Psychoanalysis, Psychotherapy and Cultural Memory. A. Hamburger & D. Laub. London: Karnac.
- (2018). Volkan, V. D., Mourning, large-group identity, and the refugee experience. In An Uncertain Safety: Integrative Health Care for the 21st Century Refugees. Eds. T. Wenzel and B. Drozdek, pp. 23–35. New York: Springer. Volkan, V. D. (2018). Refugees as the Other: Large-group identity, terrorism and border psychology. Group Analysis, 51: 343–358.
- (2018). Volkan, V. D., Refugees as the Other: Large-group identity, terrorism and border psychology. Group Analysis, 51: 343–358.
- (2019). Volkan, V. D., Large-group identity, who are we now? leader-follower relationship and societal-political divisions. The American Journal of Psychoanalysis, 79: 139–155.
- (2019). Volkan, V. D., Large-group psychodynamics and massive violence. In Introduction to Conflict Resolution: Discourses and Dynamics, eds. S. Cobb, S. Federman & A. Castel, pp. 341–358. New York: Rowman & Littlefield.
- (2019). Volkan, V. D., A non-Jewish view. In: The Handbook of Psychoanalytic Holocaust Studies: International Perspectives, ed. I. Brenner, pp. 25–31, New York: Routledge.
- (2020). Volkan, V. D., (2020). A psychopolitical approach for the reduction of ethnic, national or religious large-group conflicts. In Dalekaité. G., Galinaityté, S. & Ignatavičius, E. (Eds.), Dealing with the Trauma of an Undigested Past, pp. 59–73. Vilnius, Lithuania: Ministry of Foreign Affairs.
- (2021). Volkan, V. D., Chosen Trauma. In Social Trauma: An Interdisciplinary Textbook, eds. A. Hamburger, C. Hancheva & V. D. Volkan, pp. London: Springer.
- (2021). Volkan, V. D., Foreword for In Search of Return Mourning the Disappearances in Kashmir, by Shifa Haq.New York:Lexington Books.
- (2021). Volkan V. D., Trauma, Prejudice, Large-Group Identity and Psychoanalysis. American Journal of Psychoanalysis, 81:137–154.
- (2021). Volkan, V. D., Sixteen analysands' and large groups' reactions to the COVID‐19 pandemic. International Journal of Applied Psychoanalytic Studies, 18: 159–168.
- (2022). Volkan, V. D., A Look at Albert Einstein's Question "Why War?" with a Focus on Large-Group Psychology. International Journal of Psychoanalysis.
- (2022). Volkan, V. D. and Javakhishvili, J. D. Invasion of Ukraine: Observations on leader-followers relationships. American Journal of Psychoanalysis
- Volkan, V. D. (2023). Social wellbeing and large group psychology. In Psychological Medicine ed. by Rudolf Gregurek. Dubrovnik; Croatia
- Volkan, V. D (2023). Political leaders’ personalities, socio-political processes and the invasion of Ukraine, in Why War in Ukraine and in Europe. Psychoanalysis, Trauma, and Resiliency, ed. Leo Giuseppe Leo, pp. 51–11. Lecce, Italy: Frenis Zero Publishing House.
- Volkan, V. D. (2023) Foreword. In Psychoanalysis, COVID and Mass Trauma: The Trauma of Reality by Tihamér Bakó and Katalin Zana. New York: Routledge.
- Volkan, V. D. (2023). Remembering Jimmy Carter and his contribution to the role of psychoanalysis in world affairs. American Journal of Psychoanalysis, 82: 503-511.(DOI 10.1057/s11231-023-09404-y)
- Volkan, V. D. (2023). Foreword. In Transgenerational Haunting in Psychoanalysis: Toxic Errands by Maurice Apprey; pp: xvii-xxii. New York: Routledge.
- Volkan, V. D. (2024). Large group identity, psychological borders and unofficial diplomacy. The International Journal of Group Psychotherapy https://doi.org/10.1080/00207284.2023.2290612
- Volkan, V. D. (2024). Large Group Psychology, World Affairs and Psychoanalysis. IDioMY. Polland: Warsaw (In Polish).
- Volkan, V. D. (2024). Foreword. In The Mind Under Siege: Notes and Testimonies About War ed. Kate Alpatova, Naftally Israeli, Lia De Micheli, Valentina Palvarini, Paola Solano, Iris Sarajluc Vulkovic, Sabina Jahovich, Kai Ogimoto, Michele Vargiu, Ksenia Zeitseva, Tatiana Pankova, Svetlana Yeresko. Italy: Vecchierelli
- Volkan, V. D. (2025- in press). Animals as Large-Group Symbols. Clio Press
- Volkan, V. D. (2025- in press). Massive traumas, their Societal and Political Consequences, and Collective Healing. In Beyond Inhumanity: Understanding and Healing Spiritual Harm of Dehumanization-Towards Systematic Transformation and Flourishing of All---ed. Scherto R. Gill. DeGruter.
- Volkan, V. D. (2025-in press). Psychoanalysis, Turkey, and the IPA. In Freud in Istanbul: Turkish Contributions to Psychotherapy and Psychoanalysis, ed. Salman Akhtar. UK: Karnac.

== See also ==
- Comfort object
- Erik H. Erikson
- Fetishism
- Mourning
