= Victor Tausk =

Austro-Hungarian psychiatrist & psychoanalyst (1879–1919)

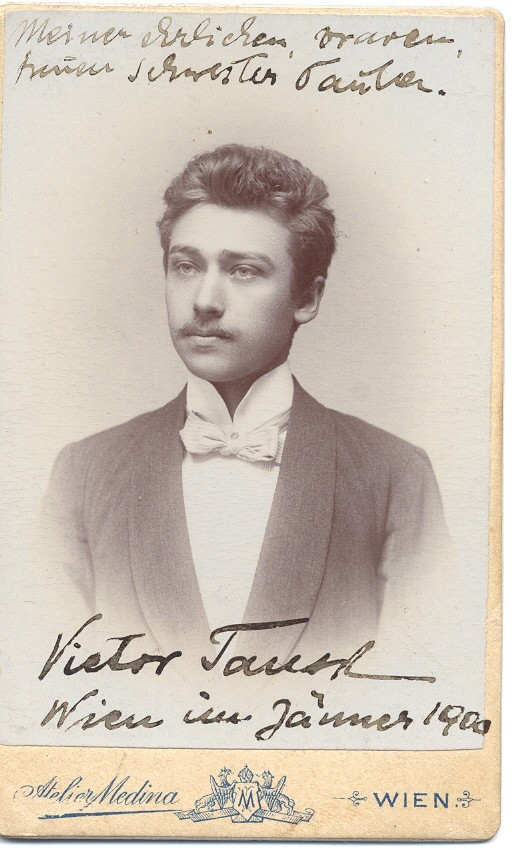
- Victor Tausk (1900)
- Born: March 12, 1879; Zsolna, Austria-Hungary
- Died: July 3, 1919 (aged 40); Vienna, Republic of German-Austria
- Known for: On the Origin of the "Influencing Machine" in Schizophrenia

Victor Tausk (also Viktor; March 12, 1879 – July 3, 1919) was a pioneer psychoanalyst and neurologist. A student and a colleague of Sigmund Freud, he was the earliest exponent of psychoanalytical concepts with regard to clinical psychosis and the personality of the artist.

== Career ==
Tausk was born as son of a Jewish journalist. He had been a lawyer and writer when he began to study medicine in Vienna around 1910. He joined the Vienna Psychoanalytic Society and soon began to contribute papers. In 1900 he converted from Judaism to Protestantism. During the First World War, he was recruited as a military doctor. The originality of his contribution to military medicine is contained in his theories on psychoses and his understanding of the phenomenon of desertion (Tréhel, G., 2006). Building up on his war experience, he wrote on war-induced psychoses while the other psychoanalysts were working on war neurosis. He took part in the debate on the disorder within the Society (Tréhel, G., 2011).

In 1919, after he had stepped out from Freud's shadow, Tausk published a paper on the origin of a delusion common to a wide array of schizophrenic patients, namely that an alien device, malignant and remote, had influenced their thoughts and their behavior. This device was referred to as the Influencing Machine and the paper was called "On the Origin of the "Influencing Machine" in Schizophrenia". It is the most well known of his publications, reaching beyond his own field of research into others, such as literary theory, for example. This work influenced many later theorists of psychoanalysis, including Heinz Kohut in his book Analysis of the Self where narcissistic regression showed great similarities with psychotic fantasmatic configurations.

His many other works include On Masturbation and The Psychology of the War Deserter, all of which have generated much controversy and discussion, arguably due to his experience within the psychoanalytic community. However, Paul Roazen has argued that Tausk's legacy is still ongoing, and that his influence has not been properly acknowledged by the psychological, or psychoanalytical communities.

== Freud and death ==
On the morning of July 3, 1919, after Helene Deutsch had stopped Tausk's treatment after Freud had demanded it, and after a complicated relation with Freud and Lou Andreas-Salomé, Tausk committed suicide by tying a curtain braid around his neck, then placing a pistol against his right temple and firing, hanging himself as he fell.

Freud wrote to Salomé that "I confess that I do not really miss him; I had long realised that he could be of no further service; indeed that he constituted a threat to the future."

Salomé replied, “What you write: ‘that fundamentally you do not miss him’, seems to me not merely understandable; for I too felt him to be a kind of ‘threat to the future’ both for you and for psycho-analysis…He knew my misgivings about him, and my apprehensions about his determination to pursue an academic career in Vienna. In March he wanted to come to Munich, but I was against it. His last letter, like many earlier ones, I did not answer. And he was justified in writing a year ago: ‘No one wants the company of an unhappy wretch – not even you.’ No, not even I”

== Selected bibliography ==
- Victor Tausk. Sexuality, War and Schizophrenia: Collected Psychoanalytic Papers (Philanthropy and Society) (1990) ISBN 0-88738-365-3

== Books on Viktor Tausk ==
- Kurt R. Eissler. Victor Tausk's Suicide (1983) ISBN 0-8236-6735-9
- Kurt R. Eissler. Talent and Genius: The Fictitious Case of Tausk Contra Freud (1971) ISBN 0-8021-0089-9
- Paul Roazen. Brother Animal: The Story of Freud and Tausk (1969) ISBN 0-8147-7395-8
- Gilles Tréhel. Victor Tausk (1879-1919) et la médecine militaire, L'information Psychiatrique, 2006, vol. 82, n°3, p. 239-247.
- Gilles Tréhel. Victor Tausk (1879-1919) : une théorisation sur les psychoses de guerre, Perspectives Psy, 2011, vol. 50, n°2, p. 162-175.

== See also ==
- Organ language
- Schizophrenia
