= Vienna Psychoanalytic Society =

German learned society (1902–1938)

The pre-war Vienna Psychoanalytic Society (German: Wiener Psychoanalytische Vereinigung, WPV), formerly known as the Wednesday Psychological Society, was the first psychoanalytic society in the world.

In 1908, reflecting its growing institutional status as the international psychoanalytic authority of the time, the Wednesday group was reconstituted under its new name with Sigmund Freud as President, a position he relinquished in 1910 in favor of Alfred Adler. During its 36-year history, between 1902 and 1938, the Society had a total of 150 members.

The new Vienna Psychoanalytic Society was inaugurated in 1946.

== Prominent members ==
- Sigmund Freud
- Alfred Adler
- Wilhelm Reich
- Otto Rank
- Karl Abraham
- Carl Jung
- Sándor Ferenczi
- Guido Holzknecht
- Isidor Isaak Sadger
- Victor Tausk
- Hanns Sachs
- Ludwig Binswanger
- Carl Alfred Meier
- Sabina Spielrein
- Margarete Hilferding
- Herbert Silberer
- Paul Schilder

== First meetings ==
In November 1902, Sigmund Freud wrote to Alfred Adler, "A small circle of colleagues and supporters afford me the great pleasure of coming to my house in the evening (8:30 PM after dinner) to discuss interesting topics in psychology and neuropathology... Would you be so kind as to join us?" The group included Wilhelm Stekel, Max Kahane and Rudolf Reitler, soon joined by Adler. Stekel, a Viennese physician who had been in analysis with Freud, provided the initial impetus for the meetings. Freud made sure that each participant would contribute to the discussion by drawing names from an urn and asking each to address the chosen topic.

New members were invited only with the consent of the entire group, and only a few dropped out. By 1906, the group, then called the Wednesday Psychological Society, included 17 doctors, analysts and laymen. Otto Rank was hired that year to collect dues and keep written records of the increasingly complex discussions. Each meeting included the presentation of a paper or case history with discussion and a final summary by Freud. Some of the members presented detailed histories of their own psychological and sexual development.

== Active years ==
As the meetings grew to include more of the original contributors to psychoanalysis, analytic frankness sometimes became an excuse for personal attacks. In 1908, Max Graf, whose five-year-old son had been an early topic of discussion as Freud's famous "Little Hans" case, deplored the disappearance of congeniality. There were still discussions from which important insights could be gleaned, but many became acrimonious. Many members wanted to abolish the tradition that new ideas discussed at the meetings were credited to the group as a whole, not the original contributor of the idea. Freud proposed that each member should have a choice, to have his comments regarded as his own intellectual property, or to put them in the public domain.

In an attempt to resolve some of the disputes, Freud officially dissolved the informal group and formed a new group under the name Vienna Psychoanalytic Society. On the suggestion of Alfred Adler, the election of new members was based on secret ballot rather than Freud's invitation. Although the structure of the group became more democratic, the discussions lost some of their original eclectic character as the identity of the group developed. The psychosexual theories of Freud became the primary focus of the participants.

After the end of World War I, the membership became more homogeneous, and the proportion of members identifying as Jewish increased. Over the course of the 36 years of its existence (until 1938), the Society registered a total of 150 members. Most members were Jewish, and 50 were (like Freud himself) children of Jewish immigrants from other Habsburg states.
