= Moi =

Moi or MOI may refer to:

== People ==
- Moi (name), a list of people with the given name or surname
- Moisés Delgado (born 1994), Spanish footballer commonly known as simply Moi
- Moisés Rodríguez (born 1997), Spanish footballer commonly known as simply Moi
- Moi people, a tribe living in Southwest Papua Province, Indonesia

== Places ==
=== Kenya ===
- Moi Air Base, a military airport east of Nairobi, Kenya
- Moi International Airport, Mombasa, Kenya
- Moi International Sports Centre, a multi-purpose stadium in Kasarani, Kenya
- Moi University, a public university in Eldoret, western Kenya

=== Norway ===
- Moi, Bygland, a village in Bygland Municipality in Agder county
- Moi, Evje og Hornnes, a village in Evje og Hornnes Municipality in Agder county
- Moi, Kvinesdal, a village in Kvinesdal Municipality in Agder county
- Moi, Lyngdal, a village in Lyngdal Municipality in Agder county
- Moi, Rogaland, the administrative centre of Lund Municipality in Rogaland county

=== Other places ===
- Moi, a village in Bâlteni Commune, Gorj County, Romania
- McLeod Glacier (South Orkney Islands)
- Moi Center, a complex of buildings in Shenyang, China

== Acronyms ==
=== Arts and entertainment ===
- The Mothers of Invention, a 1960s band led by Frank Zappa
- Master of Illusion (video game), a 2007 Nintendo DS game

=== Government and organizations ===
- Main-d'œuvre immigrée, a French trade union grouping in the first half of the 20th century
- Minister of Information or Information minister, a governmental position
- Ministry of Information (disambiguation), government ministries of various countries
- Ministry of Interior, a governmental ministry for internal affairs

=== Science and technology ===
- Mars orbit insertion, modifying the trajectory of an interplanetary spacecraft to enter a Martian orbit
- Mechanism of injury
- Moment of inertia, a quantification of the rotational inertia of an object
- Multiplicity of infection, the ratio of infectious agents to infection targets

== Languages ==
- Moi language (Congo), a Bantu language
- Moi language (Papua), spoken in the Bird's Head peninsula in northwestern Papua, Indonesia
- Moi language (Maluku), spoken on Makian Island in North Maluku, Indonesia
- MOI, ISO 639-3 code for the Mboi language of Nigeria and congo

== Other uses ==
- Mōʻī, a Hawaiian title
- Moi culture, a culture in central and northern Vietnam, northern Laos and southern Yunnan
- Moi Avenue (Mombasa), a major road in Mombasa, Kenya
- Moi, Hawaiian name for Polydactylus sexfilis, a species of fish cultivated in Hawaii
- MOI (file format), the file extension for the index file accompanying the MOD video file format used on many camcorders

== See also ==
- Moy (disambiguation)
- Moi Qatar Portal
