= Moyse =

Moyse is a surname and a given name.

== Surname ==
- Alec Moyse (1935–1994), English footballer
- Alphonse Moyse, Jr. (1898–1973), American bridge player, writer, and publisher and editor of The Bridge World
- Arthur Moyse (1914–2003), Anglo-Irish anarchist, artist and writer
- Blanche Honegger Moyse (1909–2011), Swiss-born American music conductor
- Clara Moyse Tadlock (1840–1926), British-born American poet and author
- Édouard Moyse (1827-1908), French painter and artist
- John Moyse (died 1860), captured British soldier allegedly executed by Chinese soldiers for refusing to kow-tow to a general
- Louis Moyse (1912–2007), French flutist and composer
- Marcel Moyse (1889–1984), French flutist and father of Louis Moyse
- Walter Moyse (born 1981), Canadian basketball player and brother of Heather Moyse

== Given name ==
- Moyse Alcan (1817–1869), French Jewish publisher, composer and poet
- Moyse Bayle (1755–between 1812 and 1815), French politician
- Moyse Louveture (1773–1801), military leader in Saint-Domingue during the Haitian Revolution
- Moyse Charas (1619–1698), French apothecary

== See also ==
- Locotracteurs Gaston Moyse, French manufacturer of diesel shunting locomotives
- Moise (disambiguation)
- Moyes (disambiguation)
- Moyes surname
- Moyse Building
