= Anton Pann =

Wallachian composer and musicologist (1790s-1854)

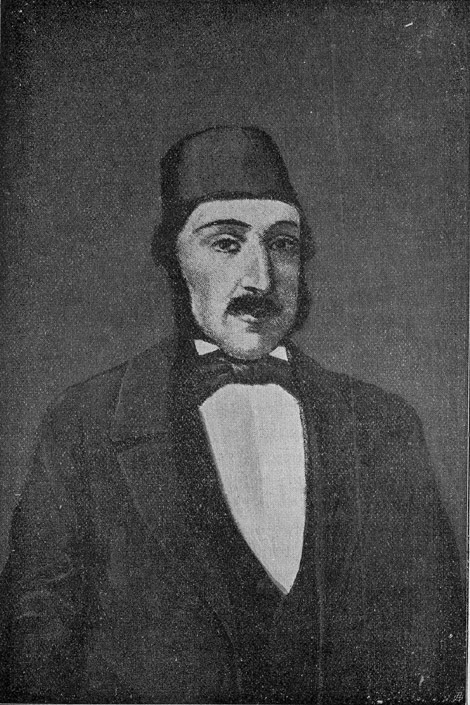
- Born: 1790 +- Sliven
- Died: 2 November 1854; Bucharest
- Occupation: poet
- Writing career
- Period: 1828–1854
- Genres: lyric poetry, epic poetry, fable, satire, aphorism

Anton Pann (Romanian pronunciation: [anˈton ˈpan]; born Antonie Pantoleon-Petroveanu [anˈtoni.e pantoleˈon petroˈve̯anu], and also mentioned as Anton Pantoleon or Petrovici; 1790s—2 November 1854) was an Ottoman-born Wallachian composer, musicologist, and Romanian-language poet, also noted for his activities as a printer, translator, and schoolteacher. Pann was an influential folklorist and collector of proverbs, as well as a lexicographer and textbook author.

== Biography ==
=== Early years ===
Pann was born sometime between 1794 and 1798, in Sliven, Rumelia (in what is today Bulgaria). According to some accounts, his mother, Thomaida, was an ethnic Greek, while his father, Pantoleon Petrov, was Bulgarian; it is known that he worked as a coppersmith bucket-maker. There is a commonly held view by Romani community activists, who consider Pann among the most prominent Romani artists. This view is also accepted by some Romanian authors. Various other interpretations state that Pantoleon Petrov, who died during Anton Pann's childhood, was Bulgarian, Aromanian, or Romanian. The writer, who was the youngest of Petrov and Thomaida's three sons, eventually adopted the surname Pann, as a colloquial contraction of his father's given name.

After he began primary education at the communal school in Sliven, the Petrovs fled the region during the Russo-Turkish War of 1806–1812 and settled in Chișinău, Bessarabia, where Anton was first employed by a Russian Orthodox choir. His two brothers were killed in the skirmishes around Brăila, as volunteers on the Imperial Russian side. Moving with his mother to Bucharest in 1810-1812, Pann would spend most of his life in the city.

Anton Pann carried on with his choral activities in Wallachia, was employed as a sexton by the Romanian Orthodox Olari and Sfinților Churches, before being tutored by the Greek musician Dionysios Foteinos (1777–1821) and allowed to attend the religious music school founded by Petros Ephesios (d. 1840). Perfecting his craft, he came to the attention of Metropolitan Dionisie Lupu, who appointed him on a commission charged with translating liturgical works from Slavonic to Romanian. The memoirist Ion Ghica later recounted that Pann attended the Saint Sava College, but this remains disputed. In 1820, he first married Zamfira Azgurean, in what was to be the first of his unhappy romantic liaisons.

=== Midlife ===
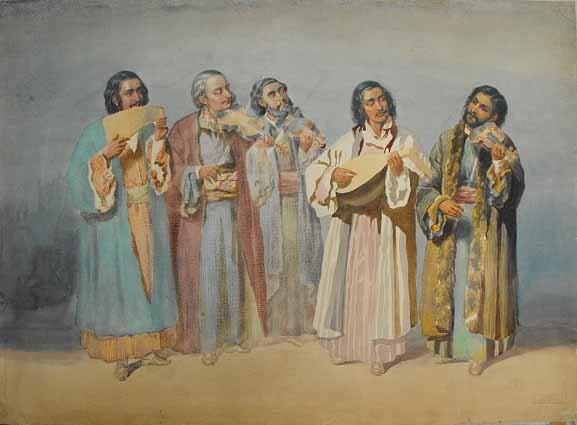
Lăutari in mid-19th-century Bucharest, as drawn by Carol Popp de Szathmary

In 1821, when Tudor Vladimirescu's rebellious forces occupied the city, Pann fled to the Transylvanian city of Kronstadt (part of the Austrian Empire), and was employed as a cantor by the Saint Nicolas Church in the ethnic Romanian neighborhood of Șchei. This temporary refuge over the Southern Carpathians mirrored that of other cultural and religious figures of the day, his fellow musician Macarie Ieromonahul among them.

He also spent time in Râmnicu Vâlcea (1827), where he was a teacher at the Orthodox seminary and, in parallel, lectured on religious music to the nuns of the Dintr-un Lemn Monastery. A scandal erupted after Pann used his position at the latter institution to seduce Anica, the mother superior's 16-year-old niece. Unsuccessfully offering her legal guardians to marry Anica in church, he eloped with her back to Șchei. While there, he became friends with the writer Ioan Barac, whom he had probably met earlier, and who, according to Pann's own testimony, gave him lessons in meter. According to some sources, he also took a trip to Buda. The literary critic Tudor Vianu attributes to Barac and Vasile Aaron, whose work constituted an adaption of various chanson de geste themes, the merit of having inspired Pann to pursue a literary career.

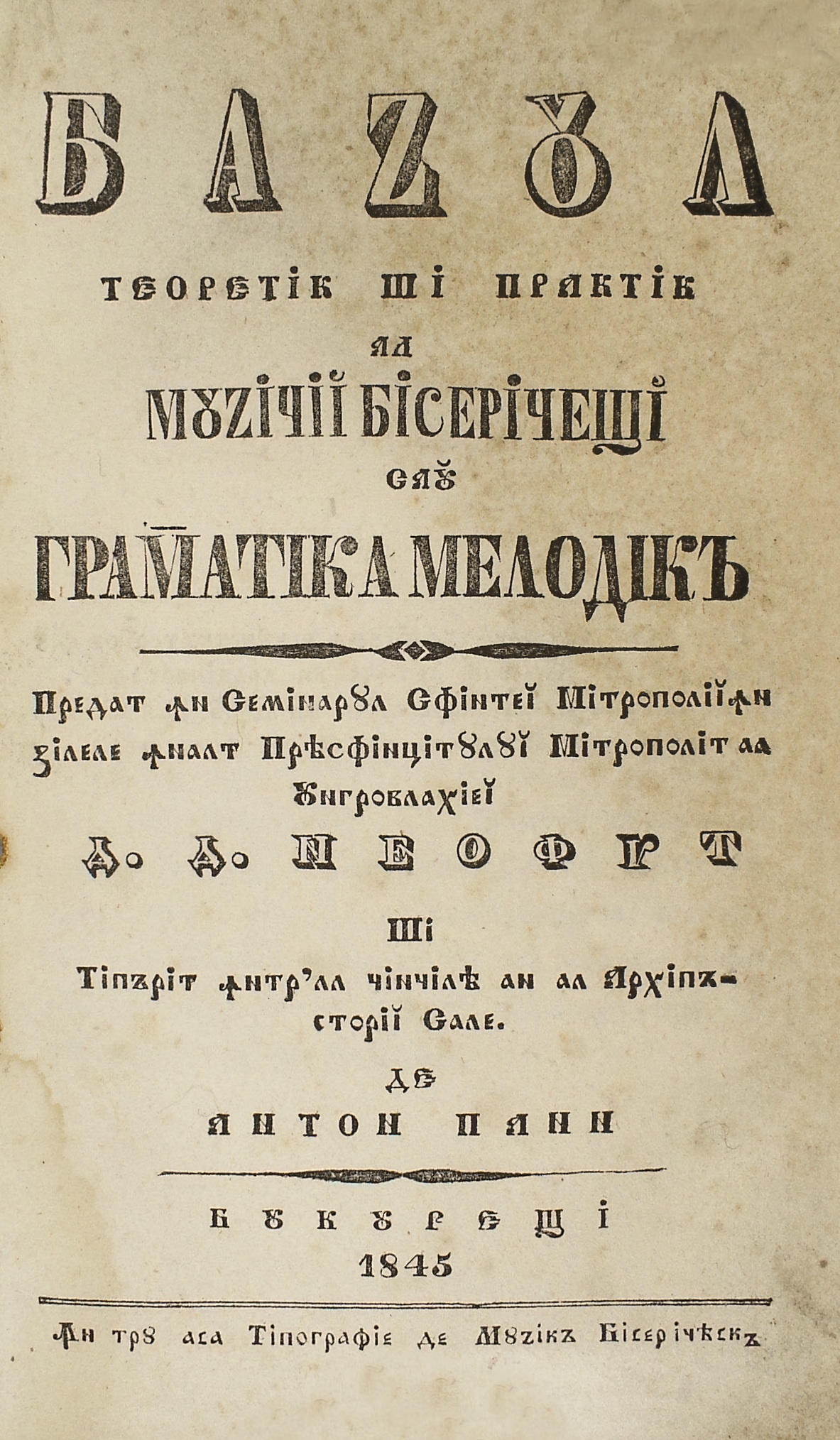
Title page of "The Theoretical and Practical Basis of Church music or the Melodic Grammar", Bucharest, 1845. Copy in the library of Stavropoleos Monastery.

Returning to Râmnicu Vâlcea in 1828, he was officially expelled from his teaching position, and, in 1828, he returned to work as a cantor for the Bucharest school on Podul Mogoșoaiei. Over the following decade, Pann authored a large panel of musical and literary works, including Noul Doxastar, which, adapted and partly recreated from Dionisie Fotino's version, assembled all officially-endorsed pieces of Christian music, and which he prefaced. According to his own testimony, this had required a major financial effort, one which almost caused his bankruptcy.

In 1837, he separated from Anica, with whom he had fathered a son (Gheorghiță) and a daughter (Tinca). Anton Pann married a third and final time in 1840, to Catinca (the more common name of Ecaterina). All three of his wives survived his death; his son by Zamfira, Lazăr, was to become an Orthodox priest.

From 1842 to 1851, with support gained from Metropolitan Neofit, Pann was employed as a music teacher by the main seminary in Bucharest (in parallel, he continued to sing at the Albă Church). During those years, he began associating with famous lăutari of his day, and regularly attended the lively social gatherings held in the gardens and orchards of Mitropoliei Hill. A passionate collector of classical-Ottoman and Romani music, which formed the staple of the lăutari repertory ever since the Phanariote period, Pann later printed some of the earliest manele tablatures. This was matched by his interest in other musical traditions: in his churchly practice, he endorsed the tradition of Byzantine hymns and removed modulations of Levantine inspiration, while he was among the first of his generation to use modern notation and Italian markings for tempo.

In 1843, Pann established a printing press inside the Olteni Church, which published works by several authors of his day, as well as a long series of almanacs. He later confessed that this enterprise had drained his economies, and that he had relied on support from various benefactors. Upon Neofit's request, he also began the translation of various religious texts. Pann's comprehensive and innovative textbook for music, Bazul teoretic şi practic al muzicii bisericeşti ("The Theoretical and Practical Basis of Church music or the Melodic Grammar"), was officially endorsed by the Metropolitan and taught at the seminary after 1845 and became a template for similar works; in addition, his printing shop sold cheap copies of popular novels, such as the Alexander Romance, the Book of 1001 Nights, the Book of Til Owl-Mirror, and the Story of Genevieve of Brabant. In March 1847, Anton Pann authored an account of the Great Fire of Bucharest. During the latter disaster, his printing shop was heavily damaged, and he was only able to salvage the presses. He resumed his activities only in 1849, when he moved the business to a house owned by Catinca Pann on Taurului Street.

=== Later years ===
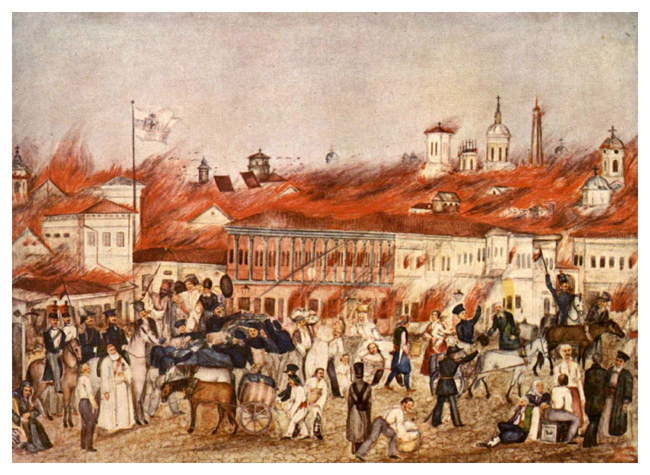
The 1847 fire in Bucharest

In 1848, he published a lexicon of words and expressions in Romanian, Russian, and Ottoman Turkish. Later in the same year, Pann sided with the liberal revolutionaries in their action against Prince Gheorghe Bibescu, was a supporter of the new Wallachian Provisional Government, participating in popular rallies in Craiova and Râmnicu Vâlcea (see 1848 Wallachian revolution). The following year, after falling severely ill, he wrote down the first version of his testament in verse (Adiata), in which he asked to be buried in Viforâta Monastery (where he hoped that his wife Catinca would become a nun). After a series of other satirical works, Pann produced a collection of writings centered on the figure of Nastratin Hogea and owing inspiration to Balkan folklore at large (first published in 1853).

In autumn 1854, Pann fell ill with typhus and the common cold during a visit to Râmnicu Vâlcea, dying soon after at his Bucharest residence; he was buried in the Lucaci Church of Bucharest, although, in his second will of August, he had asked for his final resting place to be the hermitage of Rozioara (this failure to comply was attributed to the difficulties in transportation). Catinca Pann remarried soon after this. During the early 1900s, Lucaci Church became home to a monument in Pann's honor, donated by the General Association of Church Singers — an institution presided over by Ion Popescu-Pasărea.

== Literature ==
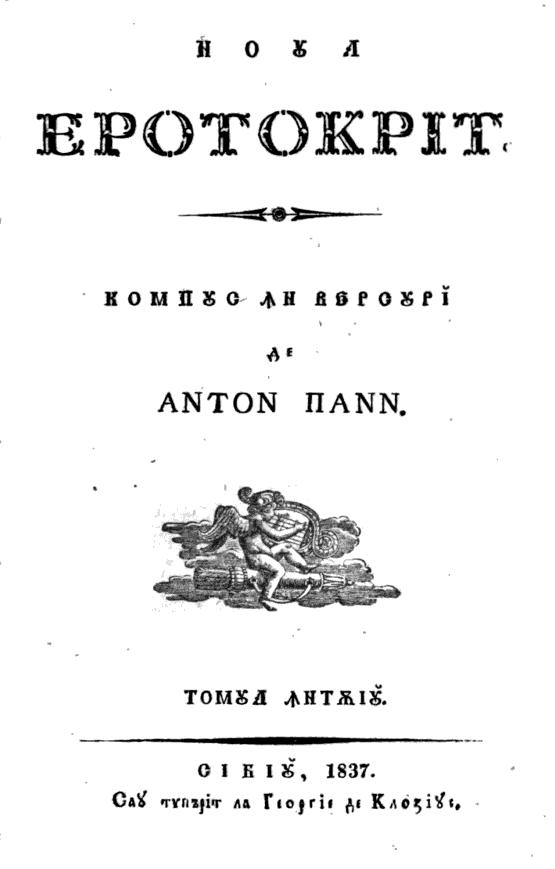
Cover of Noul Erotocrit, published in Romanian Cyrillic (Sibiu, 1837)

Pann's literary creation was noted for its reliance on a vast oral tradition, which he claimed to have codified, thus drawing comparisons to his predecessors François Rabelais, Giovanni Boccaccio, and Miguel de Cervantes. The Romanian literary critic George Călinescu drew a direct comparison between Pann and his contemporary, the Wallachian Jewish peddler Cilibi Moise, who, without producing any written works, was made famous by a series of bitter puns in which he referred to himself in the third person (such as "For a few years now, Cilibi Moise has been begging Poverty to leave his house, at the very least for as long as it takes him to get dressed").

Together with Ion Creangă and Petre Ispirescu, Pann was among the first major interpreters of Romanian folklore in 19th-century literature. Appealing primarily to a semi-educated audience, his creations have been celebrated for their familiar tone and use of plain Romanian, during a period when literary language was beginning to rely on formalism and a large number of neologisms. The writer himself made frequent excuses to the more educated of his readers for any flaws they were to find in his texts, specifying that he lacked in formal training. In the final decades of his life, several of his printed works, especially Memorialul focului mare and the manele lyrics collection Spitalul amorului, came to be appreciated by a younger generation of boyars. The Moldavian poet Vasile Alecsandri noted, in an 1872 letter quoted by Garabet Ibrăileanu: "Anton Pann has not yet been appreciated to his full value, and moreover, in Wallachia his merits are even being held in contempt by most modern men of letters".

Pann's poetic language often relies on elaborate successions of images, metaphors, or maxims. According to Călinescu, "the fundamental method" used by Pann is "the almost monstrous accumulation of aphorism, around an initial idea and through a very wide [process of] association", amounting to "a burlesque effect". He illustrated this view with a sample of proverb-lyrics:

Aideți să vorbim de geabă
Că tot n-avem nici o treabă,
Fiindcă,
Gura nu cere chirie,
Poate vorbi orice fie.
De multe ori însă,
Vorba, din vorbă în vorbă
Au ajuns și la cociorbă.
Și atunci vine proverbul:
Vorba pe unde a ieșit
Mai bine să fi tușit.

Translation:

Let's talk for nothing
It's not like we have something else to do,
Because
The mouth requires no rent
It can talk come what may.
Many times however,
The word, between exchanges,
Makes people reach for their stokers.
And that is where a proverb fits:
Instead of uttering a word
It is better to have coughed.

Almost all of Pann's work drew on recent or ancient sources, which he reinterpreted to suit the tastes of his public. In the 1880s, the scholar Moses Gaster revealed that one of Pann's major works, Înțeleptul Archir și nepotul său Anadam ("The Wise Archir and His Nephew Anadam"), made ingenious use of an old and much-circulated biography of Aesop. In researching various fables which Pann had used to expand on his proverbs, Gaster noted that they echoed obscure medieval material (including the Gesta Romanorum, Giulio Cesare Croce's Le sottilissime astutie di Bertoldo, and even Siberian Turkic folklore). One of his main pieces, the fable of the mouse who pictures himself king of all animals, originated with the Panchatantra. Tudor Vianu indicated that, in writing his book on morals (Hristoitia), Pann integrated text from Desiderius Erasmus' Adagia.

As an original element, Anton Pann used the diverse sources of his work to complement his own view of the world; according to Vianu, the latter's main traits were Pann's religious tolerance and fervor, as well as his Levantine outlook on social matters. Călinescu defined Povestea vorbei as "a false collection of folklore, given that Pann does not abide by peasant authenticity, but embellishes popular language with the cultured one, often obtaining an amazing chromatic effect". While commenting on Pann's focus on social developments of his time as "the completely mechanical ease with which current issues are put into verse", Călinescu noted that Hristoitia contained "advices which presume a state of supreme animality". In drawing the latter conclusion, he cited a stanza in which Pann asked people not to touch their genitalia in public.

O șezătoare la țară, believed to be one of Pann's most accomplished works, is written as an epic frame story in verse, and constitutes a satire of life in mid-19th century Wallachia. Reflecting the perspective of simple folk, the poem is marked by sarcastic remarks on social contrasts, Westernization, superstition, as well as tensions between estate lessors and workers (with the former stereotypically depicted as Greeks). Its final part, a denouement, went unpublished. O șezătoare la țară was also noted for the lengthy and meticulously detailed conclusions to each story, which evidenced a style borrowed from traditional storytelling. Vianu argued that the poem stands as a Romanian equivalent to The Decameron, Till Eulenspiegel, or Simplicius Simplicissimus. The text itself later became a source for aphorisms: the colloquial expression ba e tunsă, ba e rasă ("it is either trimmed or razed"), which Pann originally made in reference to an irrelevant debate over the state of an orchard, has survived as a tongue-in-cheek view of arbitrary conclusions.

Pann's influential taste for manele and their sentimental lyrics, as exemplified in his Spitalul amorului and other printed brochures, has been the target of criticism ever since the early 20th century. Tudor Vianu stressed that these works showed the influence of "the trivial popular music of his day", while Călinescu dismissed them as "lamented vulgarity and eroticism".

== Legacy ==
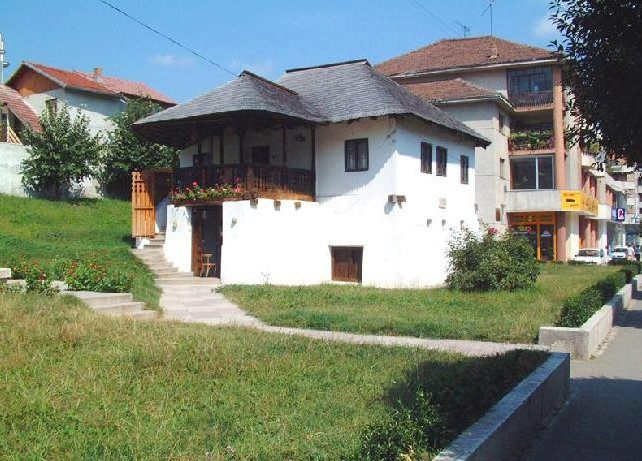
The Anton Pann Memorial House in Râmnicu Vâlcea

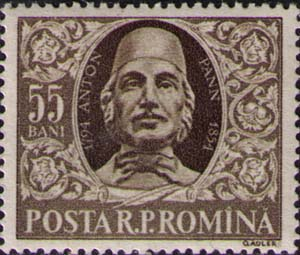
Anton Pann's portrait on a Romanian postage stamp (1955)

Pann is generally believed to have authored the music to Deșteaptă-te, române!, Romania's national anthem. His associate Gheorghe Ucenescu is known to have arranged the melody to the lyrics of Andrei Mureșanu, but Pann's direct implication in the creative process was allegedly not confirmed by sources. According to one account, Ucenescu had used a romanza composed by Pann in 1839, in turn complementing the lyrics of Grigore Alexandrescu. It has also been argued that the music was that of a popular lied, and first published in one of Pann's manele collections. The ethnographic research carried out by Dimitrie Gusti confirmed that the same melody was being sung as a folk song by Southern Dobrujan ethnic Turks in the 1930s.

Mihai Eminescu, one of Romania's most influential poets, made a reference to Pann in his poem Epigonii (1870), which, in its opening verses, traces the development of early literature and the impact of Romanticism. Cited alongside Dimitrie Cantemir, Dimitrie Țichindeal, Vasile Cârlova, Ienăchiță Văcărescu, Alexandru Sihleanu, Ion Heliade Rădulescu, Cezar Bolliac and others, Pann is referred to as the son of Pepelea, the witty hero of folk literature, and complimented with the words "as clever as a proverb". During the interwar period, the works of Anton Pann were reflected and complimented in the modernist poetic art of Ion Barbu. Barbu's Nastratin Hogea la Isarlâk uses Pann's main character to tragic effect, depicting, in willing contrast to the proverbial setting, Nastratin's violent self-sacrifice. George Călinescu noted that Pann's "mix of buffoonery and seriousness" present in the works of poet Tudor Arghezi, came "in the line of Anton Pann".

In 1945, Lucian Blaga authored a three-act play named Anton Pann, centered on the poet's Șcheii Brașovului period. A museum of the life and activity of Anton Pann exist in Râmnicu Vâlcea, and, since 1990, a public theater in the same city bears his name.

== Works ==
=== Literary works ===
- Versuri musiceşti ("Musical Lyrics")
- Poezii deosebite sau cântece de lume ("Various Poems or Worldly Chants")
- Îndreptătorul bețivilor ("The Correction Instrument for Drunks")
- Hristoitia sau Şcoala moralului ("Hristoitia or the School of Morals")
- Noul erotocrit ("The New Erotokritus")
- Marș de primăvară ("March of the Spring")
- Memorialul focului mare ("A Memoir of the Great Fire")
- Culegere de proverburi sau Povestea vorbei ("Collection of Proverbs or the Story of the Word")
- Adiata ("Testament")
- Înțeleptul Archir și nepotul său Anadam ("Archir the Wise and His Nephew Anadam")
- Spitalul amorului sau Cântătorul dorului ("The Hospital of Love or the Singer of Longing")
- O șezătoare la țară sau Călătoria lui Moș Albu ("A Countryside Gathering or Father Albu's Trip")
- Versuri sau Cântece de stea ("Lyrics or Songs to the Stars")
- Cântătorul beției. Care cuprinde numele bețivilor si toate faptele care decurg din beție ("The Poet of Drunkenness. Comprising the Names of Drunks and All Deeds Caused by Drunkenness")
- Triumful beției sau Diata ce o lasă un bețiv pocăit fiului său ("The Triumph of Drunkenness or the Testament Left by a Penitent Drunk to His Son")
- Năzdrăvăniile lui Nastratin Hogea ("The Mischiefs of Nastratin Hogea")
- Povești și angdote versificate ("Versified Stories and Anecdotes")
- De la lume adunate și iarăși la lume date ("[Sayings] Gathered from Folk and Returned to Folk")

=== Textbooks ===
- Bazul teoretic şi practic al muzicii bisericeşti sau Gramatica melodică ("The Theoretical and Practical Basis of Church music or the Melodic Grammar")
- Dialog în trei limbi, rusește, românește și turcește ("Dialog in Three Languages: Russian, Romanian and Turkish")
- Mică gramatică muzicală teoretică și practică ("Concise Musical Grammar, Theoretical and Practical")

== Relevant Literature ==
- Munteanu, Luminița. Being Homo Balkanicus Without Knowing It: The Case of Anton Pann. INTERNATIONAL BALKAN ANNUAL CONFERENCE (IBAC): BOOK SERIES (4)-- A HISTORY OF PARTNERSHIP AND COLLABORATION IN THE BALKANS, pp. 123–138.
- Șendrescu, Ileana. "THE EXPRESSIVITY OF THE POPULAR LANGUAGE IN THE POETRY OF ANTON PANN." LIMBA ȘI LITERATURA–REPERE IDENTITARE ÎN CONTEXT EUROPEAN 20 (2017): 85-91.
