= Moise =

Moise is a given name and surname, with differing spellings in its French and Romanian origins, both of which originate from the name Moses: Moïse is the French spelling of Moses, while Moise is the Romanian spelling. As a surname, Moisè and Mosè are Italian spellings of Moses.

== Given name ==
=== Moise ===
- Moise of Wallachia (died 1530), Romanian prince
- Moise Crăciun (born 1927), Romanian skier
- Moise Fokou (born 1985), American football linebacker
- Moise Movilă (1596–1661), Prince of Moldavia
- Moise Poida (born 1978), Vanuatuan footballer
- Moise Pomaney (born 1945), Ghanaian long-jumper
- Moise Safra (1935–2014), Brazilian businessman and founder of Banco Safra
- Moise Kean (born 2000), Italian footballer

=== Moïse ===
- Moïse Amyraut (1596–1664), French theologian
- Moïse Brou Apanga (born 1982), Côte d'Ivoire born Gabonese footballer
- Moïse Bambara (born 1984), German-Burkinabé footballer
- Moïse Bebel (1898–1940), Guadeloupean soldier
- Moïse Bombito (born 2000), Canadian soccer player
- Moïse de Camondo (1860–1935), French banker
- Moïse Fortier (1815–1877), Quebec businessman
- Moïse Haïssinsky (1898–1976), French Ukrainian-born Jewish physicist and radiochemist
- Moïse Houde (1811–1885), Quebec politician
- Moise Joseph (born 1981), Haitian middle-distance runner
- Moïse Kandé (born 1978), Mauritanian footballer
- Moïse Katumbi (born 1964), governor of the Katanga province in the DRC
- Moïse Kisling (1891–1953), Polish-Jewish French painter
- Moïse Lévy de Benzion (1873–1943), Egyptian Jewish department store owner and art collector
- Moïse Plante (1830–1892), Quebec merchant and politician
- Moïse Rahmani (1944–2016), Egyptian-born Belgian-Congo then Belgian Jewish author
- Moïse Schwab (1839–1918), French librarian
- Moïse Tshombe (1919–1969), president of Katanga and prime minister of the DRC
- Moïse Vauquelin (fl. 1650–1670), French buccaneer

== Surname ==
=== Moise ===
- Anthony Moise, Dominican politician
- Cilibi Moise (1812–1870), Romanian Jewish humorist
- Edwin E. Moise (1918–1988), American mathematician
- Harold A. Moise (1879–1958), associate justice of the Louisiana Supreme Court
- Irwin S. Moise (1906–1984), associate justice of the New Mexico Supreme Court
- Patty Moise (born 1960), American NASCAR driver
- Romario Moise (born 1996), Romanian footballer
- Rudy Moise (born 1954), retired colonel in the United States Air Force, doctor, lawyer, politician, entrepreneur and actor
- William Moise (1922–1980), American painter

=== Moïse ===
- Edwin Warren Moïse (1810–1868), Jewish-American physician and Judge in the Confederate States of America of French-Haitian descent
- Edwin Warren Moïse (born 1832) (1832–1902), Jewish-American lawyer, politician, and military officer of the Confederate States Army
- Jean-Charles Moïse (born 1967), Haitian politician
- Jovenel Moïse (1968–2021), Haitian politician and president of Haiti
- Lenelle Moïse (born 1980), Haitian actress
- Martine Moïse (born 1974), first lady of Haiti
- Penina Moïse (1797–1880), American poet of French-Jewish descent
- Teri Moïse (1970–2013), Haitian-American singer

== Others ==
- Roch Thériault (1947–2011), Canadian cult leader and convicted murderer, self-proclaimed prophet under the name Moïse

== See also ==
- Moyse, a given name and surname
- Mont du Lac à Moïse, a mountain in Canada
