= Moy =

Moy or MOY may refer to:

== Places ==
- Loch Moy, a loch south of Inverness in the Highlands of Scotland
  - Moy, Highland, a village beside Loch Moy
  - Moy Hall, also near the loch and the ancestral home of the chiefs of Clan Mackintosh
  - Rout of Moy, an event in the Jacobite rising of 1745
- Glen Moy, a glen in Glen Clova, north of Forfar, Scotland
  - A raspberry, cultivar named after this glen
- Moy, a hamlet, hunting lodge and forest west of Loch Laggan, Highland, Scotland
- Moy Castle, ancestral home of the Clan Maclaine of Lochbuie in Scotland
- Moy, County Tyrone, a village in Northern Ireland
- River Moy, a river which runs through County Sligo and County Mayo in Ireland
- Moÿ-de-l'Aisne, a comune in northern France
- Moy House (disambiguation)

== People ==
- Moy (surname), a list of people so named
- Mei (surname), a Chinese surname which can be transliterated as Moy, including a list of people
- Moy Shmull, Palauan spearfisher
- Mooy Lambert (died 1625), Dutch vice admiral

== Other uses ==
- Moy (salt) – A measure for salt used in colonial British North America
- HMS Moy (1904), a Royal Navy destroyer launched in 1905
- Moy (ship), an iron sailing ship launched in 1885
- Moy Racing, a defunct NASCAR auto racing team
- "Moy", a series of virtual pet games by Frojo Apps

== See also ==
- Moi (disambiguation)
- Mooy (disambiguation)
- Moye (disambiguation)
