= Information minister =

Government's minister of information

An information minister (also called minister of information) is a position in the governments of some countries responsible for dealing with information matters; it is often linked with censorship and propaganda. Sometimes the position is given to a separate Minister of Culture.

== Information ministries by country ==
- Bangladesh: Ministry of Information and Broadcasting
- Egypt: Ministry of Information
- Hong Kong: Director of Information Services
- India: Ministry of Information and Broadcasting
- Indonesia: Ministry of Communication and Information Technology
- Israel: Information Minister of Israel
- Lebanon: Ministry of Information (Lebanon)
- Malaysia: Minister of Communications and Multimedia (Malaysia)
- Namibia: Minister of Information and Communication Technology
- Nigeria: Minister of Information and Communications
- North Macedonia: Ministry of Information Society and Administration
- Palestine: Information Minister
- Philippines: Presidential Communications Group (Philippines)
- Saudi Arabia: Minister of Culture and Information
- Serbia: Ministry of Information (Serbia)
- Singapore: Minister of Information, Communications and the Arts
- South Korea: Ministry of Science and ICT
- Thailand: Minister of Information and Communication Technology
- Ukraine: Minister of Culture and Information Policy
- Vietnam: Minister of Information and Communications

== Historic information ministries ==
- Australia: Minister for Information (1939–1950)
- Iraq: Information Minister (a historical position during the presidency of Saddam Hussein)
- France: Minister of Information, leading the Ministry of Information (a historical position between 1938 and 1974, succeeded by the Minister of Culture and Communication and the Spokesperson of the Government)
- Nazi Germany: Minister of Public Enlightenment and Propaganda (a historical position in Nazi Germany)
- Norway: Ministry of Culture and Enlightenment (a historical position in German occupation of Norway during World War II)
- Russia: Minister of National Enlightenment (a historical position in Imperial Russia before the 1917 Russian Revolution)
- United Kingdom: Minister of Information (a historical position in the British government during the First and World War II)
- United States: Office of War Information (served as the connection between the battlefront and civilian communities during World War II)

== See also ==
- Ministry of Information
- Ministry of propaganda
- National data protection authorities
- Information commissioner
