= MUI =

MUI, Mui, or mui may refer to:

== Computing ==
- Magic User Interface, system to generate graphical user interface
- Multilingual User Interface, Microsoft's technology and file name extension for multiple languages on a Windows system

== Organizations ==
- Indonesian Ulema Council (Indonesian: Majelis Ulama Indonesia), Indonesian Muslim clerical body.
- Muhammad University of Islam
- MUI Group, Malayan United Industries.

== Places ==
- Mui (मुई), a village in Sawai Madhopur district, Rajasthan
- Mui River in Ethiopia
- Mui, Estonia, a village

== People ==
- Constance L. Mui (born 1959), American philosopher
- Kong Duen-yee, known as Mui Yee
- Mei (surname), Chinese surname
- Peter Mui, American fashion designer

== Economics ==
- Matter Under Inquiry, a preliminary investigations by the US Securities and Exchange Commission
- Men's underwear index, an economic index

== Other uses ==
- mui, ISO 639 code for the Palembang language also known as Musi

== See also ==
- Muy (disambiguation)
