= Muy =

Muy or MUY may refer to:

- Muy River (Wetetnagami River), a tributary of the Wetetnagami River in Quebec, Canada
- Muyang language, an Afro-Asiatic language spoken in northern Cameroon assigned the ISO 639 code muy
- Mouyondzi Airport, Republic of the Congo, assigned the IATA code MUY
- Galeria Muy, in Chiapas, Mexico

== See also ==
- Muy Muy, a municipality in Matagalpa Department, Nicaragua
- Le Muy, a commune in the department of Var, France
- Mooy (disambiguation)
- Mui (disambiguation)
