= Tadlock =

Tadlock is a surname. Notable people with the surname include:

- Clara Moyse Tadlock (1840–1926), American poet
- Johnny Tadlock, American politician
- Tad Tadlock (1931–2000), American dancer
- Tim Tadlock (born 1968), American baseball coach

== See also ==
- Tonya Tadlock; see Franklin Delano Floyd
