= JVC GZ-MG555 =

Consumer camcorder produced in 2007

The JVC GZ-MG555 camcorder (in North America), also known as the JVC GZ-MG575 (in Asia and Europe), was produced by JVC in 2007. It records standard definition MPEG-2 video onto either a built-in hard disk drive or on a secure digital memory card in MOD format.

Video can be recorded in four quality settings: Ultra Fine (720 x 480, 8.5 Mbit/s), Fine (720 x 480, 5.5 Mbit/s), Normal (720 x 480, 4.2 Mbit/s), and Economy (352 x 240, 1.5 Mbit/s). The built-in hard drive has a capacity of 30 GB (40 GB for GZ-MG575) and can hold up to 7 hours of video when recorded at the highest quality setting.

When recording to a memory card, the recording time depends only on the capacity of the card. The GZ-MG555 uses full-size SDHC memory cards. One 4 GB card can fit roughly 1 hour of video at the highest quality setting. There are no limitations for using any of the recording formats when recording to a memory card.

In 2007 this camcorder had the largest imaging sensor for a consumer camcorder, 1/2.5". Other distinguishing features of this camcorder include:

- External microphone jack
- Accessory shoe
- Built-in neutral-density filter
- FireWire port
- Threaded lens barrel for attachments
- Black body color

Lacking from the camcorder is an optical viewfinder, headphone output, focus ring, and full manual mode.

== Specification ==
- Sensor: 1/2.5-inch 5.37 Megapixel CCD
- Lens speed: f/3.5
- Filter Diameter: 46 mm
- Optical Zoom: 10x
- Image Stabiliser: digital
- Viewfinder: No
- LCD Screen: 2.8"
- Headphone Out: No
- Microphone In: Yes
- Recording media: built-in 30 GB (GZ-MG555) or 40 GB (GZ-MG575) HDD, SDHC memory card (card is not included)
- Weight: 750 g
