= Eva Reich =

American physician

Dr. Eva Renate Reich (27 April 1924 – 10 August 2008) also credited as Dr. Eva Reich Moise, was an Austrian-American physician. She continued some of her father, Wilhelm Reich's controversial work on orgonomy, and found recognition for energy massage during the New Age movements of the 1960s. She also developed a type of infant massage for babies with colic known as butterfly baby massage.

== Early life and education ==
Reich was born on 27 April 1924 in Vienna. She was the eldest child of Annie Pink and Wilhelm Reich. Her parents were both well-known Freudian psychoanalysts. The family moved to America in 1938 when Eva was the age of 14.

She studied at Barnard College and then obtained a medical degree from Women's Medical College of Pennsylvania. Reich did her residency in pediatrics in New York. In 1951, Reich qualified as a physician.

== Career ==
In 1952, Reich and her husband moved to Hancock and Reich set up in private practice until 1962. After her father's death in 1957, she adapted some of his theories and incorporated them positively into her practice. Reich ran a Montesorri school for 4 years from 1963 to 1966 before returning to medicine.

In 1968, she was delivering babies. From 1970, she operated mobile birth control clinics in Maine. She also developed a type of infant massage for babies with colic dubbed "butterfly baby massage". The method is still used in Europe.

== Personal life and death ==
In 1950, Reich moved to her father's laboratory and an observatory, Orgonon, near Rangeley, Maine. The artist William Moise came to work at Orgonon as her father's assistant and the pair later got married. The couple had one daughter, Renata in 1960. They later divorced in 1974.

Reich retired in 1992 and suffered a series of strokes before her death. She died on 10 August 2008 in Hancock at the age of 84.
