= Moye (name) =

Moye is a surname and a given name. It means "With Royalty". People named Moye include:

== Given name ==
- Guan Moye (born 1955), pen name Mo Yan, Chinese novelist and short-story writer
- Moye Kolodin (born 1987), German classical pianist
- Moye W. Stephens (1907–1995), American pioneer aviator and businessman, co-founder of Northrop Aircraft, Inc.

== Surname ==
- Derek Moye (born 1988), American National Football League player
- Famoudou Don Moye (born 1946), American jazz percussionist and drummer
- Jean-Martin Moye (1730–1793), French Catholic priest, missionary in China and founder of the Sisters of the Congregation of Divine Providence; beatified by the Catholic Church
- Malina Moye (born 1984), American singer, songwriter, guitarist and entrepreneur
- Michael G. Moye (born 1954), American former television writer and producer
- Muhiyidin Moye (1985–2018)
- Rick Moye (born 1956), American politician

== See also ==
- Moye (disambiguation)
- Moy (surname)
- Moi (name)
- Moyes, a surname
