= Ministry of Information and Broadcasting =

Ministry of Information and Broadcasting may refer to:

- Ministry of Information and Broadcasting (Bangladesh)
- Ministry of Information and Broadcasting (Ghana)
- Ministry of Information and Broadcasting (India), a branch of the Government of India
- Ministry of Information and Broadcasting, merged into the Ministry of Information and Communication Technology (Namibia) in 2008
- Ministry of Information & Broadcasting (Pakistan)
- Ministry of Information and Broadcasting (South Sudan), a branch of the Government of South Sudan

== See also ==
- Ministry of Information, Broadcasting and National Heritage (Pakistan), a branch of the Government of Pakistan
- Ministry of Information (disambiguation)
