= Mooy =

Mooy (from Middle Dutch: mooy, meaning beautiful, pretty) is a Dutch surname that may refer to the following notable people:

- Aaron Mooy (born 1990), Australian footballer of Dutch origin
- Adrianus Mooy (born 1936), Indonesian economist
- Brodie Mooy (born 1990), Australian footballer, cousin of Aaron
- Christoffel Joseph Mooy (1921–1971), Indonesian politician
- Jan Mooy (1776–1847), Dutch painter
- Mooy Lambert, nickname of Lambert Hendriksz (1550s–1625), Dutch vice admiral

== See also ==
- Muy (disambiguation)
- Moy (disambiguation)
