= Moy (surname) =

Moy is a surname which may refer to:

- Hendrik de Moy (1534–1610), Secretary
- Mei Bo (sometimes Moy Bo), an official of the Shang Dynasty
- Lexton Moy (born 1985), American soccer player of Chinese and Filipino heritage
- Matthew Moy (born 1984), Chinese-American TV actor
- Milagros Moy (born 1975), Peruvian volleyball player
- Sylvia Moy (1938–2017), American singer and songwriter
- Moy Yat (1938–2001), Wing Chun kung fu master
- Moy Lin-shin (1931–1998), Taoist monk, teacher, and T'ai chi instructor

== See also ==
- Mei (surname)
- Moi (name)
- Moye (name)
- Moy (disambiguation)
