= Annie Reich =

Austrian-American psychoanalyst (1902–1971)

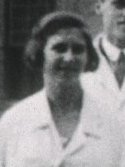
- Reich in 1927
- Born: Annie Pink; April 9, 1902; Vienna, Lower Austria, Austria-Hungary
- Died: January 5, 1971 (aged 68); Pittsburgh, Pennsylvania, U.S.
- Spouse: Wilhelm Reich (m. 1922–1933)
- Children: 2, including Eva

Academic background
- Education: Vienna University

Academic work
- Discipline: Psychiatrist
- Sub-discipline: Psychoanalyst

Annie Reich (Austrian German: [raɪç]; née Pink; 9 April 1902 – 5 January 1971) was a Viennese-born psychoanalyst who became a leading analytic theorist in post-war New York.

== Life ==
Annie Reich was the third child to a Theresa Singer and Alfred Pink (a school teacher and merchant respectively). She had two brothers: Fritz (killed during WWl) and Ludwig (went to Australia).

Annie Reich studied medicine at Vienna University from 1921 to 1926. She became interested in psychoanalysis at the same time, began an analysis with Wilhelm Reich (interrupted by their marriage in 1922), and continued analysis with Hermann Nunberg. She also had a training analysis with Anna Freud.

She joined the Vienna Psychoanalytic Society in 1928, the Berlin Psychoanalytic Society around 1930, and the New York Psychoanalytic society (where she became president from 1960-1962.

She had two daughters – Eva Reich and Lore Reich – with Reich before their separation in 1933. Thereafter Annie Reich moved with her children to Prague. She became part of the circle around Otto Fenichel before emigrating to the United States on the eve of World War II.

== Theoretical contributions ==
After an early publication on the successful treatment of a paranoid (1936), Reich produced a study of female sexual submission in terms of identification with the partner's superior body (1940). She returned to the theme after the war, with a study of narcissistic object choice in women, which she saw as driven by what she called 'narcissistic want', in turn the product of childhood narcissistic injury. A lack of self-esteem was met by identification with a grandiose male partner.

Reich explored another route for dealing with self-esteem issues in a study of grotesque humor. By caricaturing her own body flaws, the protagonist was able simultaneously to attack those around her. In this way she was able to fend off temporarily the condemnation of her own strict superego, in a struggle that had however to be ceaselessly renewed, and whose occasional failure led to deep depression. Reich's interest in such early damage to self-esteem makes her work a bridge between ego psychology and self psychology.

Reich also made contributions to the technique of psychoanalysis, specifically on countertransference and on the termination of therapy. She restated the classical view of countertransference as the projection of past attitudes and feelings of the analyst on to the patient, in opposition to the interactive view then coming to the fore of countertransference as revealing something about the patient: the methodological challenge she presented of distinguishing between the two still remains cogent. She also warned that, even after analysis of the transference, the analyst will still appear "as a person endowed with special power, special intelligence and wisdom...as partaking in the omnipotence which the child attributes to the parents", a problem only the lapse of time post-termination may cure.

== Selected articles ==
- Reich, Annie (1940). "A Contribution to the Psycho-Analysis of Extreme Submissiveness in Women". The Psychoanalytic Quarterly. 9 (4): 470–480. doi:10.1080/21674086.1940.11925438. ISSN 0033-2828.
- Reich, Annie (1950). "On the Termination of Analysis". The International Journal of Psycho-Analysis. 31: 179–183.
- Reich, Annie (1951). "On counter-transference". The International Journal of Psycho-Analysis. 32: 25–31.

== See also ==
- Acting out
- Black humour
- Counterphobic attitude
- Ernst Kris
- Frances Deri
- Kate Friedlander
