= Moyes (disambiguation) =

Moyes is a surname.

Moyes may also refer to:

Places:

- Cape Moyes, Queen Mary Land, Antarctica
- Moyes Islands, George V Land, Antarctica
- Moyes Nunatak, Graham Land, Antarctica
- Moyes Point, Signy Island, South Orkney Islands

Companies

- Moyes Delta Gliders, an Australian aircraft manufacturer
- Moyes Microlights, an Australian aircraft manufacturer
