= Ministry of Information and Communication Technology =

Ministry of Information and Communication Technology or Communications Technology may refer to:

- Ministry of Information and Communications Technology (Colombia)
- Ministry of Information, Communications & Technology (Eswatini)
- Ministry of Information and Communications Technology (Iran)
- Ministry of Information and Communications Technology (Jordan)
- Ministry of Information and Communication Technology (Namibia)
- Ministry of Information and Communication Technology (Sri Lanka)
- Ministry of Information and Communication Technology (Thailand)
- Ministry of Information and Communications Technology (Zimbabwe)

== See also ==
- Ministry of Information (disambiguation)
