= Department of Information =

The term Department of Information may refer to the following:

- Department of Information (Australia)
- Department of Information (United Kingdom)

== See also ==
- Ministry of Information (disambiguation)
- Department of Information and Public Relations (Kerala), in the India state
- Department of Information Technology, Electronics and Communications (Telangana), in the Indian state
- Department of Information and Cultural Affairs (West Bengal), in the Indian state
