= Lucaci Church =

Orthodox church in Bucharest, Romania

Coordinates: 44°25′52″N 26°06′49″E

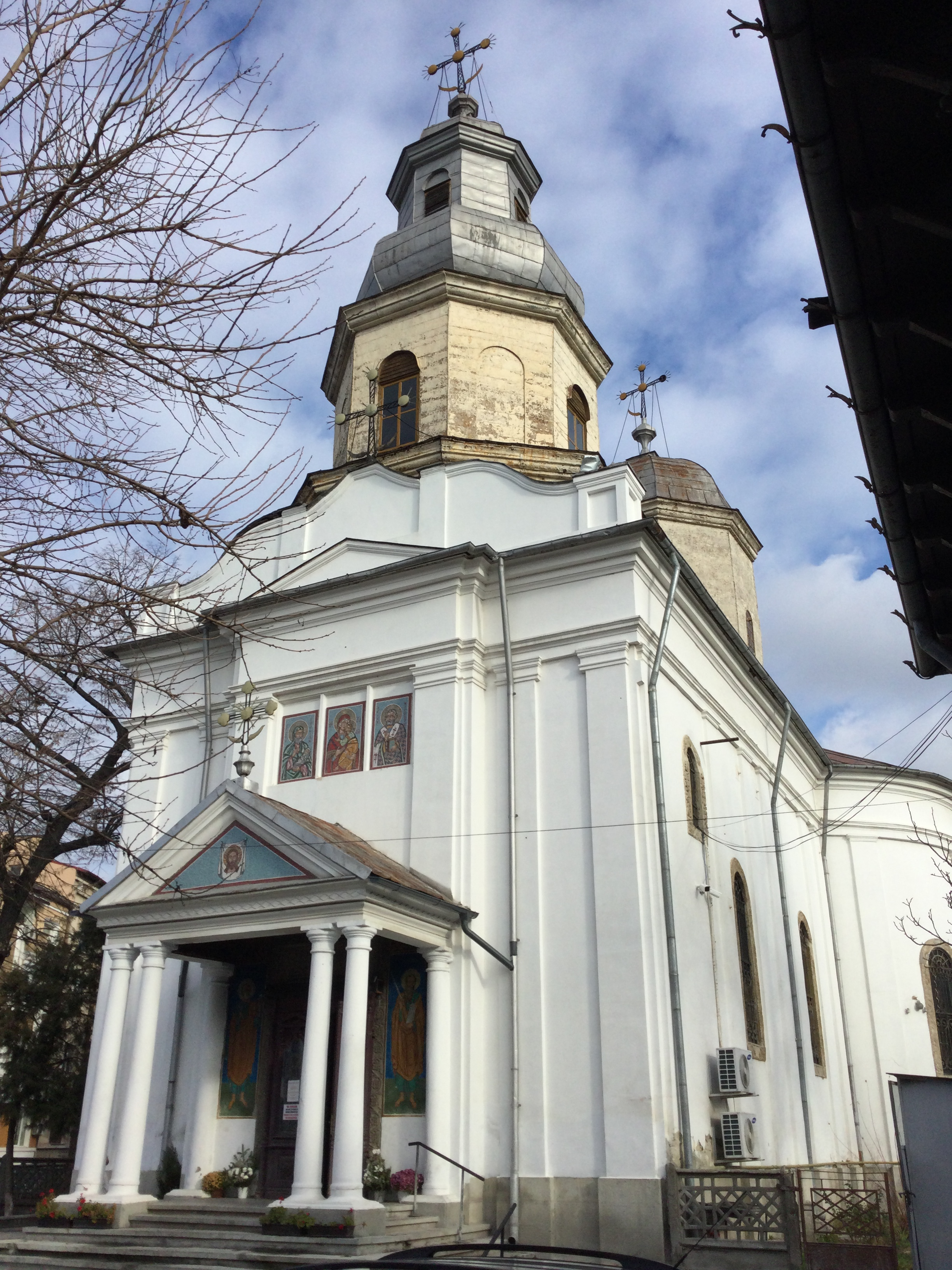
Lucaci Church

The Lucaci Church (Romanian: Biserica Lucaci) is a Romanian Orthodox church located at 6 Logofăt Udriște Street in Bucharest, Romania. It is dedicated to Saints Nicholas and Stylianos.

== History ==
The first church on the site was built of wood around 1600 by a certain Lucaci; the area then lay at the city’s periphery. It was probably destroyed during the wars of the early 17th century. It was rebuilt of masonry in 1736 under the guidance of Stephen II, Metropolitan of Ungro-Wallachia. The old pisanie is now fixed on the north side of the church. Numerous 18th-century references to the building and surrounding district survive. The 1802 and 1838 earthquakes damaged the church, as did the 1821 uprising, when it served as a point of anti-Ottoman resistance.

Due to its deteriorated state, the church was rebuilt in its current form in 1842, as noted on the new pisanie in Romanian Cyrillic characters. Two of the ktetors were Aromanian merchants. They were encouraged to take on this role by local resident and composer Anton Pann, who himself originated south of the Danube. He was buried outside near the altar, and a bust stands in the churchyard; additionally, he is painted on the western side, next to the ktetors. Others who concerned themselves with the church include Gheorghe Ionescu-Gion, August Treboniu Laurian, Ion Heliade Rădulescu and a number of teachers from the nearby Matei Basarab High School.

A fire on Easter night 1847 partly destroyed the church, together with twelve others in the vicinity. The locals soon started to rebuild, finishing in 1853. The interior panels were painted at that time, but later deteriorated. Various guilds were in charge: in 1859, the church was held by the sellers of tobacco, coffee, sweets and cakes as well as by the pastry shop owners. Their feast was the day of the Life-giving Spring, an icon of which remains in the iconostasis. In the early 20th century, a leather wholesaler donated a silver-edged icon of Saint Spyridon, patron of leather- and boot-makers, so that the church became a place of worship for these guilds as well. Repairs took place in 1969-1971 and again after the 1977 quake. After being repainted, the church was rededicated in 1986.

== Description ==
The cross-shaped church is 27 meters long by 10-16 meters wide, with circular apses on the exterior and thick, high walls. The nave is topped by an octagonal dome. The bell tower, above the narthex, is Baroque in style. It has an octagonal base and mid-section, the latter with four windows; ending in a bulbous roof with another eight-sided tip. Both domes are of tin-plated wood.

The facades are Greek Revival, with eclectic elements, pilasters and an edge carved in relief. On the western facade, there is a rounded pediment and, below, a small triangular one. The icons of the patron saints are painted on the latter. Entrance is through a small portico closed in 1998, which has yet another triangular pediment that rests on two pairs of stone columns. The large windows are decorated with vines and grapes, as is the frame of the new pisanie. The church owns sacred objects and books donated by Metropolitan Stephen, including a reliquary of Saint Stylianos.

The church is listed as a historic monument by Romania's Ministry of Culture and Religious Affairs, as are Pann’s grave and bust.

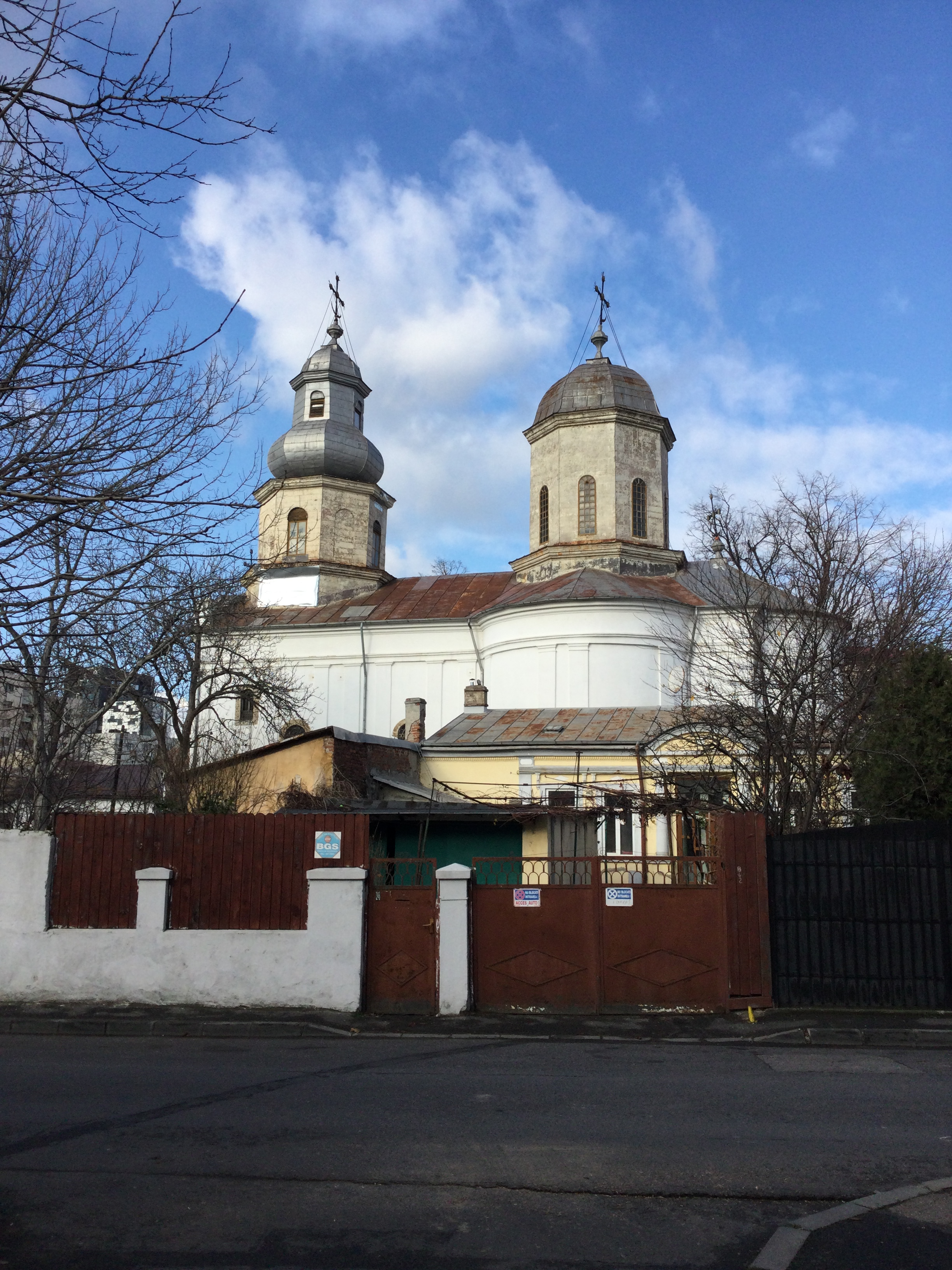
Side view

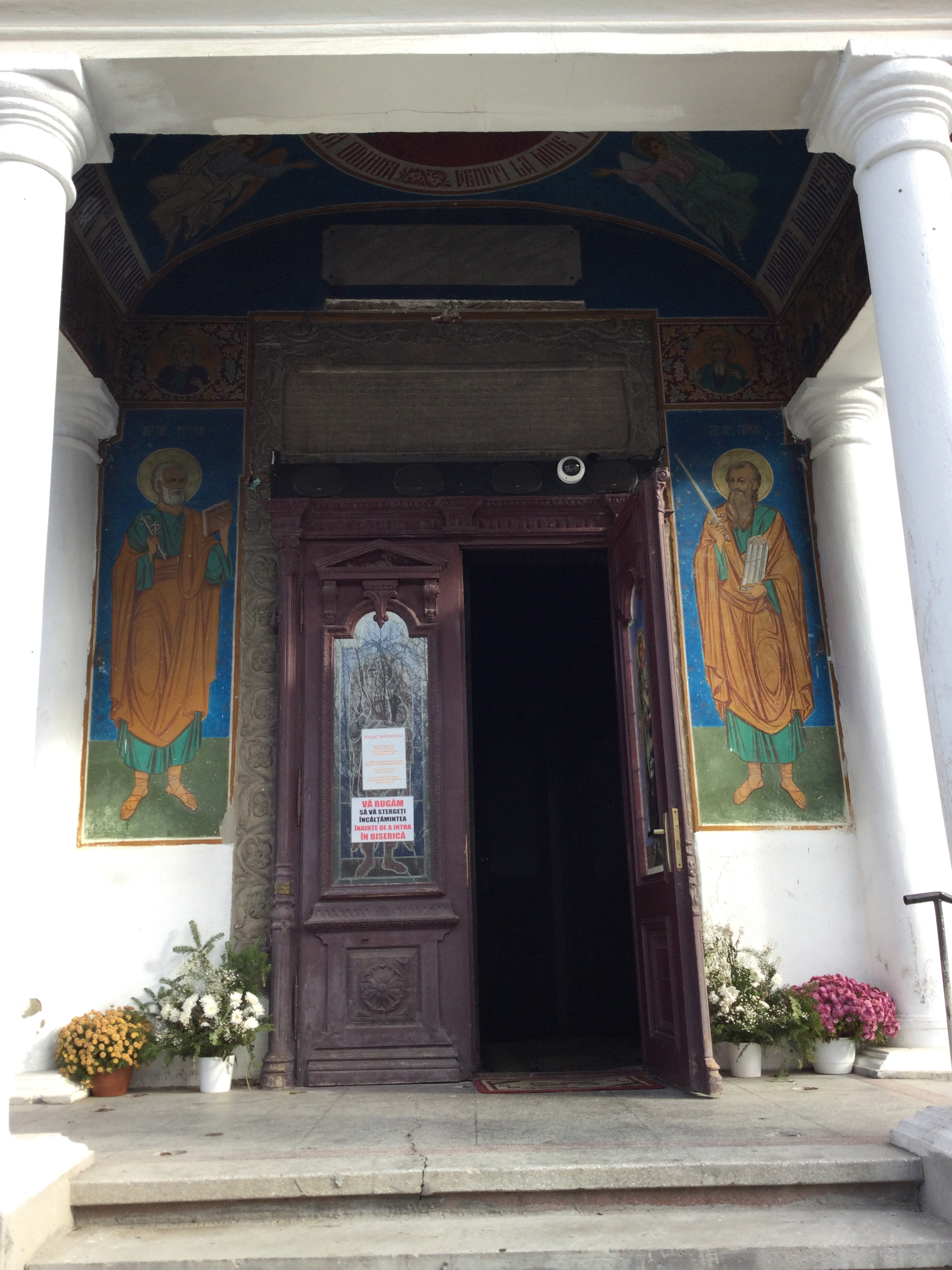
Entrance

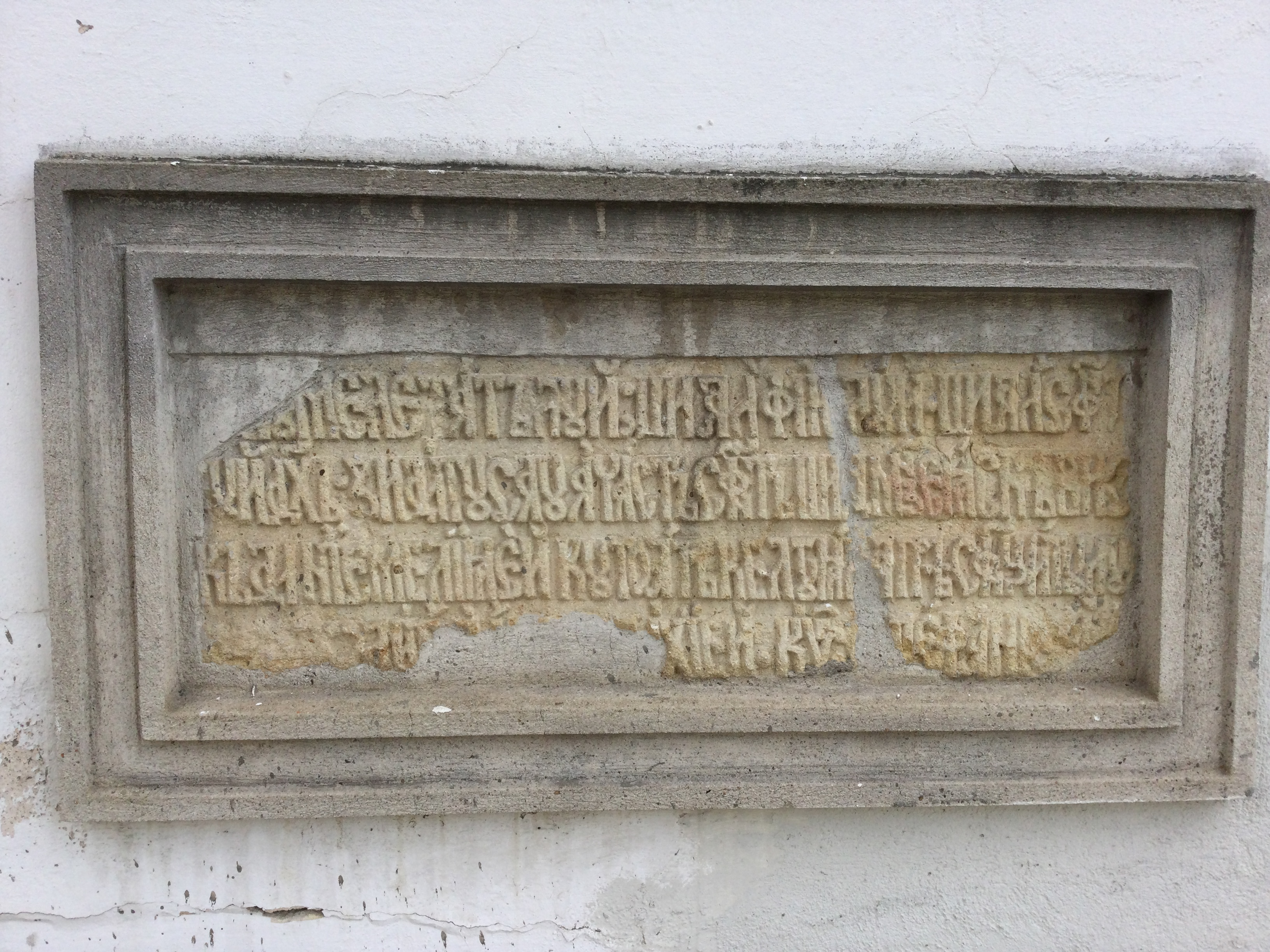
Old pisanie

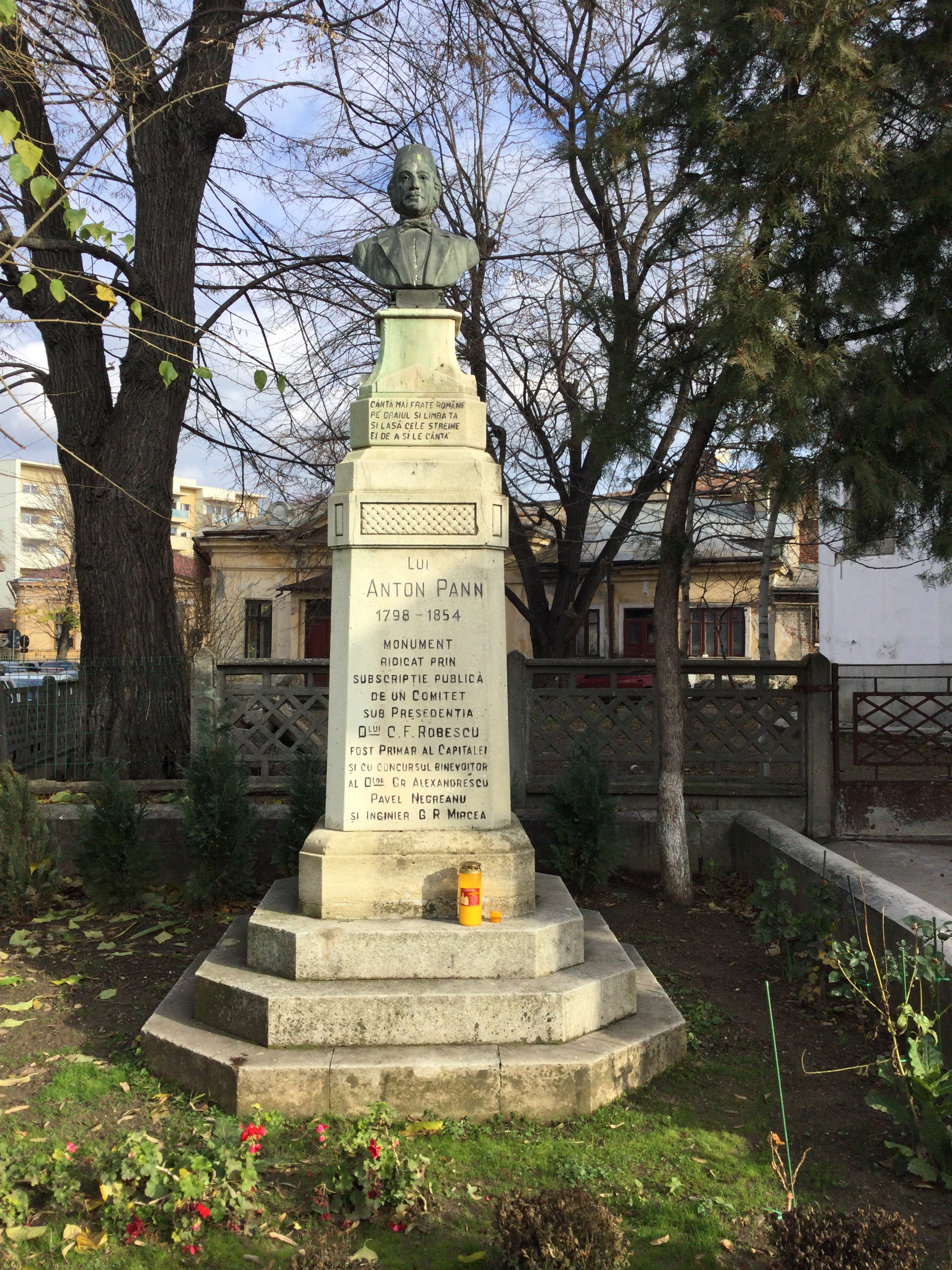
Anton Pann monument
