= Ministry of Information and Communication =

Ministry of Information and Communication or Communications may refer to:

- Ministry of Information and Communication (Bhutan)
- Ministry of Information and Communication (Cuba), Cuba
- Ministry of Information and Communication (Fiji), Fiji
- Ministry of Information and Communications (Kenya)
- Ministry of Information and Communications (Nepal)
- Ministry of Information and Communication (South Korea)
- Ministry of Information and Communications (Vietnam)

== See also ==
- Ministry of Information (disambiguation)
