= Moyes =

Moyes is a surname. It may refer to:

- Chris Moyes (1949–2006), CEO of British Go-Ahead transport group
- Dave Moyes (born 1955), Scottish former footballer
- David Moyes (born 1963), Scottish football manager and former player
- Rev Gordon Moyes (1938–2015), Australian Christian evangelist and New South Wales MLC for Family First party
- Helen Fraser (feminist), later Moyes (1881–1979), Scottish suffragist, feminist, educationalist, politician emigrated to Australia, toured America to develop WWI Women's Land Army
- Henry Moyes (c. 1750–1807), blind Scottish lecturer on science subjects
- James Moyes (1851–1921), Scottish writer, theologian
- John Moyes (disambiguation) several people including:

- John Moyes (cricketer) (born 1946), English cricketer
- John Stoward Moyes (1884–1972), Australian Anglican bishop
- Johnny Moyes, born Alban George Moyes (1893–1963), Australian cricketer and commentator, brother of Morton Moyes

- Jojo Moyes (born 1969), English journalist and romance novelist
- Kim Moyes, Australian DJ and musician with "The Presets" electronica duo
- Kris Moyes, Australian director and producer of music videos
- Morton Henry Moyes (1886–1981), Australian Antarctic explorer and naval officer
- Patricia Moyes (1923–2000), British mystery writer

== See also ==
- Moyse, a list of people with the surname or given name
- Moye (name), a list of people with the surname or given name
