= Ministry of Information =

Ministry of Information may refer to:

== National government departments ==
- Ministry of Information (Bahrain), now known as the Information Affairs Authority
- Ministry of Information (Bangladesh)
- Ministry of Information and Communication (Bhutan)
- Ministry of Information (Cambodia)
- Ministry of Information (Czechoslovakia)
- Ministry of Information (Egypt)
- Ministry of Information (Eritrea)
- Minister of Information (France), a defunct position
- Ministry of Information and Broadcasting (India)
- Ministry of Information (Indonesia)
- Ministry of Information (Iran)
- Ministers of Information (Iraq), a list of Iraqi Information Ministers who served under Sadam Hussein
- Information and Diaspora Minister of Israel
- Ministry of Information (Kuwait)
- Ministry of Information (Lebanon)
- Ministry of Information, Communication and Culture (Malaysia)
- Ministry of Information (Myanmar)
- Ministry of Information, Broadcasting and National Heritage (Pakistan)
- Ministry of Information, Technology and Tourism (Puntland)
- Ministry of Media (Saudi Arabia)
- Ministry of Information (Serbia)
- Ministry of Communications and Information (Singapore)
- Ministry of Information, Posts and Telecommunication (Somalia)
- Ministry of Information (Sudan)
- Ministry of Information (Syria)
- Ministry of Information, Culture and Sports, of Tanzania
- Ministry of Information Policy (Ukraine)
- Ministry of Information (United Kingdom)
- Ministry of Information and Media (Zambia)

== Other uses ==
- Government department in the 1985 dystopian science fiction film Brazil

== See also ==
- Department of Information (disambiguation)
- Government Information Office
- Ministry of Information and Communication (disambiguation) of various countries
- Ministry of Information and Communication Technology (disambiguation) of several nations
- Ministry of Information and Broadcasting (disambiguation) of several states
- Ministry of propaganda
- Moi (disambiguation)
