= MOD and TOD =

Recording formats for use in digital tapeless camcorders

MOD and TOD are recording formats for use in digital tapeless camcorders. The formats are comparable to XDCAM EX, HDV and AVCHD.

== Overview ==
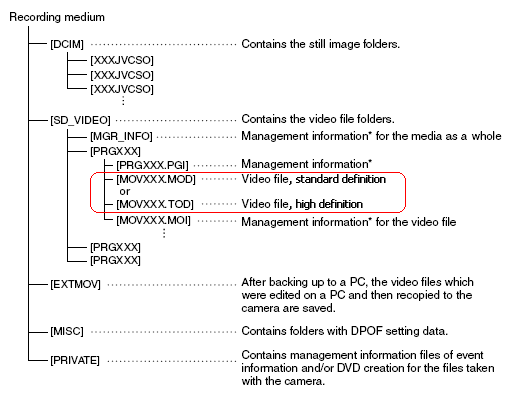
MOD/TOD directory structure

MOD and TOD are informal names of tapeless video formats used by JVC (MOD and TOD), Panasonic (MOD only) and Canon (MOD only) in some models of digital camcorders. Format names correspond to extensions of video files. Neither JVC nor Panasonic, who pioneered the format, explained the meaning of the file extensions, and the formats were never given an official name. Some think that TOD stands for "Transport stream on disk". MOD is used exclusively for standard definition video files, while TOD is used for high definition files.

The first camcorders that used MOD format appeared in 2003. JVC introduced the Everio GZ-MG30, which recorded directly to an internal hard disk drive. Panasonic unveiled the SDR-S100, which recorded to SD cards. The encoding scheme, data rate, frame rate and frame size closely matched parameters of DVD-video.

In January 2007 JVC announced its first high definition tapeless consumer camcorder, the Everio GZ-HD7, which recorded 1080i MPEG-2 video to either a built-in hard disk drive or an SD memory card. Data rates, frame sizes and frame rate were comparable to 1080-line XDCAM and HDV video. Panasonic has never released a consumer high definition camcorder that used TOD recording format. Instead, Panasonic joined Sony to develop AVCHD.

In January 2008 Canon unveiled a family of tapeless standard definition consumer camcorders: the FS100, FS10 and FS11. All these camcorders record in MOD format.

Both MOD and TOD are file-based formats that are stored on a random-access media. Directory structure and naming convention are identical except for extensions of media files. Each file has a sequential name with last three characters comprising a hexadecimal number, which allows for 4096 unique file names.

Standard definition video is stored in MPEG program stream container files with MOD extension; in most other systems these files have extension MPG or MPEG. High definition video is stored in MPEG transport stream container files with TOD extension; in most other systems these files have M2T extension.

Despite the file structure being unique to this video recording format, the location for still images follows the standard agreed upon by many still camera manufacturers.

Standard definition video can be recorded in 4:3 and 16:9 formats. Some video decoders do not interpret the aspect ratio information in the media file header correctly, so 16:9 video may appear squeezed horizontally when viewed. Software that is shipped with camcorders is capable of processing the aspect ratio information correctly, aided perhaps by the metadata stored in MOI files. There are also third-party tools for modifying the wide-screen aspect ratio information in the media file header so that it satisfies decoders which would otherwise fail to interpret this information correctly in an unmodified MOD file. Some tools such as MediaInfo can correctly report the aspect ratio of widescreen MOD files, but media players may or may not display them correctly depending on the capabilities of the video decoder that they are utilizing at the time.

== Conversion to widely accepted formats ==
MOD video can be viewed on a computer with a player that is capable of reproducing MPEG-2 video. This video can be easily authored for watching on a DVD player without recompression, because it is fully compliant with DVD-video standard.

TOD format is comparable with AVCHD, but cannot be directly played on consumer video equipment. Media files must be packaged into distribution formats like HD DVD or Blu-ray Disc, using authoring software. One of TOD recording modes, "1440CBR", has the same frame size, aspect ratio and frame rate as 1080i HDV, and can be loosely called "HDV on disk".

While many camcorders that produce the MOD and TOD formats also include Windows and/or Mac conversion software to run on your computer, there are other tools available for free to do the same work. Transport stream files can be converted into program stream files without recompressing the video itself. For example, FFmpeg, a free program, performs the conversion on Windows, Mac and Linux systems with the following command

$ ffmpeg -i myClip.TOD -vcodec copy -acodec copy myClip.mpg

A similar command is used for MOD files:

$ ffmpeg -f mpeg -i myClip.MOD -vcodec copy -acodec mp2 -ab 192k myClip.mpg

This is no longer necessary if the free and open source VLC media player is used, and, at least on Linux, the process is usually automated, such that connecting the camera to the PC via USB invokes the file manager and then the intuitive action of selecting a TOD file invokes VLC to play the file, or allows a simple copy and paste to transfer the file to the PC. VLC is also available for Windows.

== Specifications ==
Name of format	MOD	TOD
Media	Hard disk drive, solid-state memory cards	
Video
Video signal	480i, 576i	1080/60i, 1080/50i
Frame size in pixels	720 x 480, 720 x 576, 704 x 480, 352 x 480	1440 x 1080, 1920 x 1080
Frame aspect ratio	4:3, 16:9	16:9
Video Compression	MPEG2 Video (profile & level: MP@ML)	MPEG2 Video (profile & level: MP@HL)
Chroma sampling format	4:2:0	
Compressed video bitstream rate	~3 - 10 Mbit/s depending on quality mode	~17 - 30 Mbit/s depending on quality mode
Audio
Compression	MPEG-1 Audio Layer II or Dolby Digital	
System
Stream type	Program stream	Transport stream
Media file extension	MOD (on camcorder), MPG or MPEG (on computer)	TOD (on camcorder), M2T (on computer)

== See also ==
- H.262/MPEG-2 Part 2: digital video compression scheme
- HDV: tape-based high definition format that uses MPEG-2 Part 2 video compression
- XDCAM: a family of tapeless high definition formats that use MPEG-2 Part 2 video compression
