= Moi (name) =

Moi is a surname and given name. Notable people with the name include:

== Given name ==
- Moi Avei (born 1946), Papua New Guinean politician
- Moi Gómez (born 1994), Spanish footballer
- Moi Torrallardona (born 1966), Spanish off-road rally truck co-driver and navigator
- Moi Ver (1904–1995), photographer and painter

== Surname ==
- Daniel arap Moi (1924–2020), President of Kenya from 1978 to 2002
- Gideon Moi (born 1964), Kenyan politician and youngest son of Daniel arap Moi
- Joey Moi, Canadian music producer
- Lena Moi (1926–2004), First Lady of Kenya and wife of Daniel arap Moi
- Toril Moi (born 1953), Duke University professor

== See also ==
- Moy (surname)
- Moye (name)
