= Moye (disambiguation) =

Moye is a commune in France.

Moye may refer to:

== Other places ==
- Moye Boarding House, a historic building in Portland, Tennessee
- Moye Complex, a football and lacrosse stadium at Mercer University

== Other uses ==
- Moye (name)

== See also ==
- Moye moye, an internet meme originating from the Serbian song "Džanum" by Teya Dora
