= Cilibi Moise =

19th-century Romanian folklorist

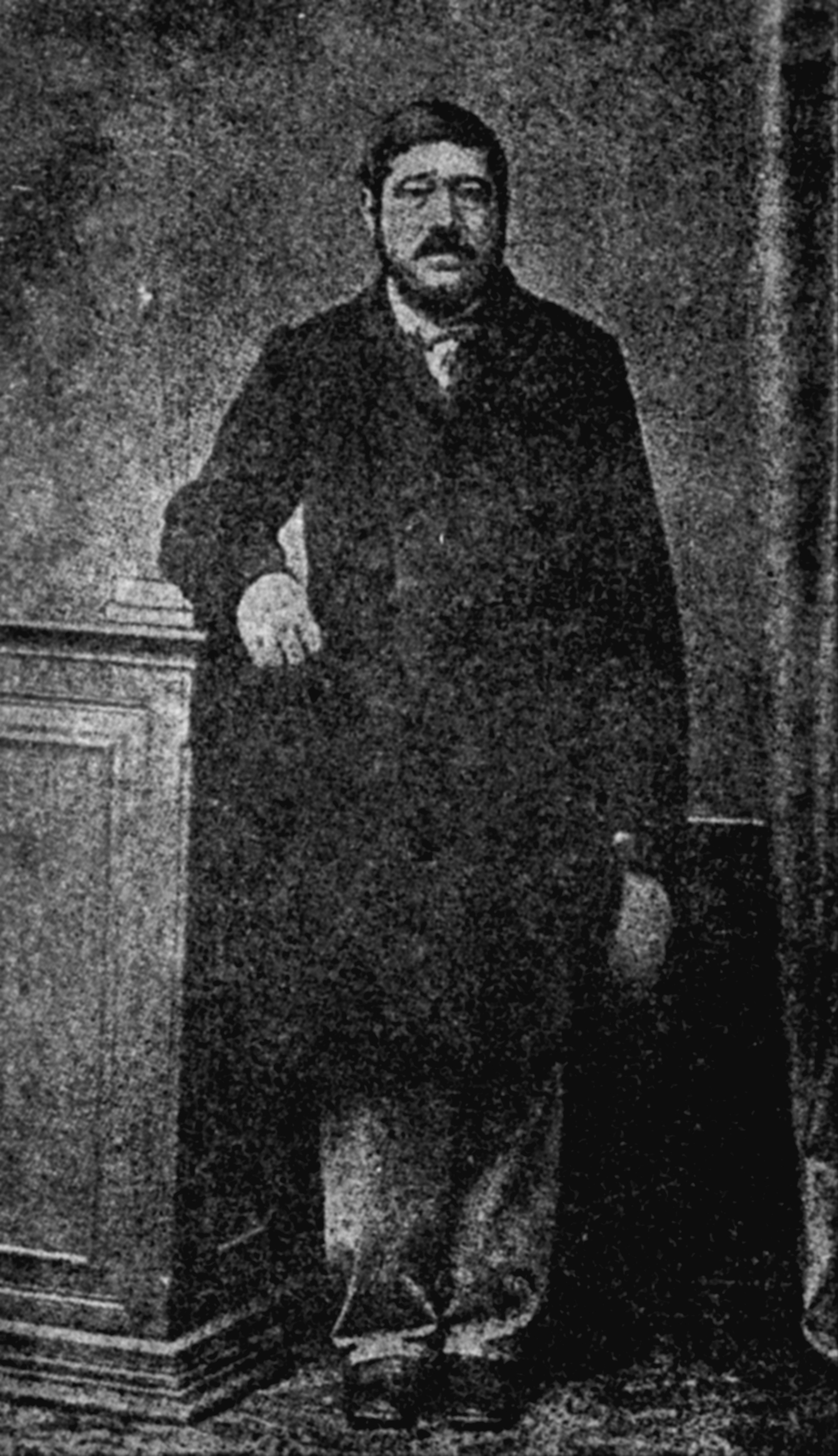
- Born: Froim Moise; 1812
- Died: 31 January 1870 (aged 57–58)

Cilibi Moise or Cilibi Moisi (born Froim Moise; 1812 – January 31, 1870) was a Moldavian-born Wallachian and Romanian peddler, humorist, aphorist, and raconteur. He is best known for the aphorisms and anecdotes attributed to him, which, although recorded in Romanian, represent an important segment of the local secular Jewish culture and Jewish humor in the 19th century. Moise relied on others to record his own creations, and these often refer to him using the third person, which made him a stock character.

== Biography ==
Born into the Jewish community in Focşani, Moise lived much of his life in Bucharest, where his family moved when he was a child. In time, he became one of the boccegii (peddlers who carried their merchandise in bundles). His moniker Cilibi originated with the Ottoman Turkish word çelebi, meaning "courteous".

Moise traveled throughout the Danubian Principalities, and his experience in assessing people's characters, as well as his interest in memorizing catchphrases, contributed to his literary career. Part of his musings originated in the Talmud. Unable to spell in anything but the Hebrew alphabet, he dictated his sayings to literate Romanians and handed them down to be printed. In all, 13 or 14 brochures were published in this way.

Moise was a member of the Jewish congregation in Bucharest, and was close to its Hakham, Moses Gaster – Gaster was to recall their meetings in his writings. Moise died of typhus at the age of 58, and was buried at the Filantropia Cemetery (in the Jewish section).

== Work and influence ==
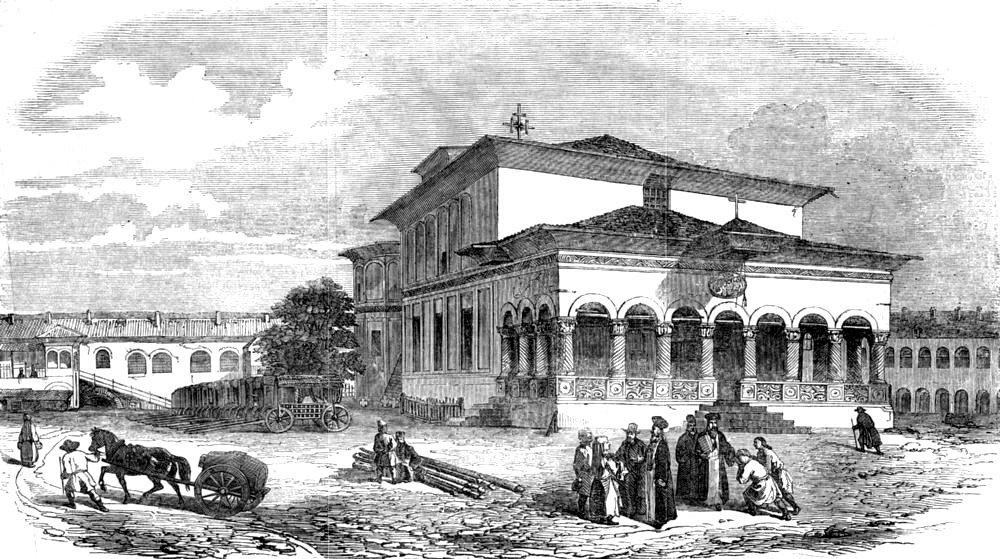
The Saint George Church in Bucharest (1837 print)

Some of his most remembered one-line jokes include:

At all times, Cilibi Moise has two houses near Saint George Church and two houses near Saint Demetrius Church; in one of each he lives, and in the others he would like to move, but has no means to pay the rent.

Cilibi Moise suffered a great shame – his house was visited by robbers who found nothing to steal.

For a few years now, Cilibi Moise has been begging Poverty to leave his house, at the very least for as long as it takes him to get dressed.

Moise was regarded by many as an important contributor to both Romanian and Jewish-Romanian literature. Influential dramatist and short story author Ion Luca Caragiale admired his work, and especially the cohesion of his ideas. Caragiale confessed that he grew up reading Moise, and, during the 1890s, promoted his works in the journal Epoca (of which he was coeditor).

Literary historians George Călinescu and Tudor Vianu both cited Moise as a parallel to the Ottoman-born Wallachian writer Anton Pann. Călinescu referred to his style as "good old healthy humor", while Vianu likened him to Diogenes.

Moise's sayings were first collected and studied by Moses Schwarzfeld in 1883: Schwartzfeld's book was printed in Craiova as Practica şi apropourile lui Cilibi Moise Vestitul din Ţara Românească ("The Practice and Themes of Wallachia's Cilibi Moise the Famous"). Samples of Moise's work formed the first part of a 1996 anthology, which listed Romanian-language Jewish literature from him to Paul Celan; the work, published by Editura Hasefer, was edited by Ţicu Goldstein (De la Cilibi Moise la Paul Celan. Antologie din operele scriitorilor evrei de limba română).
