= John Moyes =

John Moyes may refer to:

- John Moyes (cricketer) (1946–2024), English cricketer
- John Moyes (bishop) (1884–1972), Australian Anglican bishop and author
- Johnny Moyes (1893–1963), Australian cricketer

== See also ==
- John Martin Moye
