= Dionisie Fotino =

Wallachian historian

Dionisie Fotino (Greek: Dionysios Foteinos, 1769–1821) was a Wallachian historian and high ranking civil servant of Greek origin.

Born in Patras, Fotinos (Photeinos, Gr. Φωτεινός ) hailed from the so-called Phanariote families within the Ottoman Empire. He moved to Wallachia in 1804.

Fotino was one of the first scholars to propose a Daco-Roman ancestry for the Romanians by stating, in his History of Old Dacia of 1818, that "the Romans and Dacians, crossbreeding, created a distinct, mixed people" in Dacia Traiana province.

== Sources ==
- Boia, Lucian (2001). History and Myth in Romanian Consciousness (Translated by James Christian Brown). Central European University Press. ISBN 963-9116-96-3.
- Georgescu, Vlad (1991). The Romanians: A History. Ohio State University Press. ISBN 0-8142-0511-9.
