= Alexandru Sihleanu =

Alexandru Sihleanu (January 6, 1834–March 14, 1857) was a Wallachian poet.

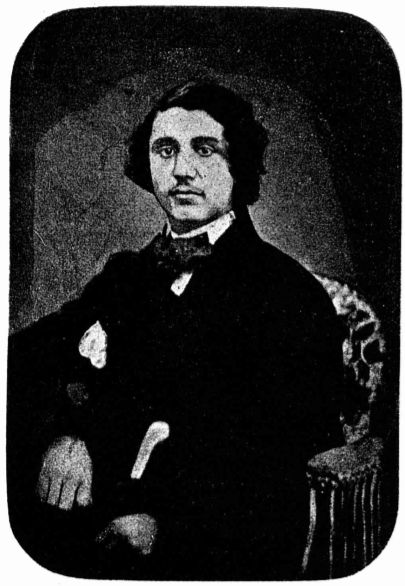
Alexandru Z. Sihleanu

Born in Bucharest to paharnic (royal cup-bearer) Zamfirache Sihleanu, he spent his childhood at the Sihlele estate. He began school at Saint Sava Academy, followed by Lycée Louis-le-Grand from 1852, and took up but abandoned the study of law. He was high school classmates with Alexandru Odobescu, his first biographer. Sihleanu returned home in 1855, contributing to Concordia and writing verses, which he collected into his only book. Titled Armonii intime and containing 24 poems, it was published two months before his death of, as Odobescu put it, "an extraordinary disease, unknown even to doctors, a sad phenomenon of nature". Two other poems appeared posthumously, in Concordia and Românul. The original 1857 edition of his book appeared again in 1871, with a preface by George Crețianu; another edition came out in 1896, and Nicolae Iorga published yet another in 1909. His Romantic verses are of a Byronic cast; invoking the cosmic and the fantastic, they anticipate Mihai Eminescu's motifs.
