= Galeria Muy =

Maya and Zoque art gallery in Chiapas

Espacio de Arte Muy
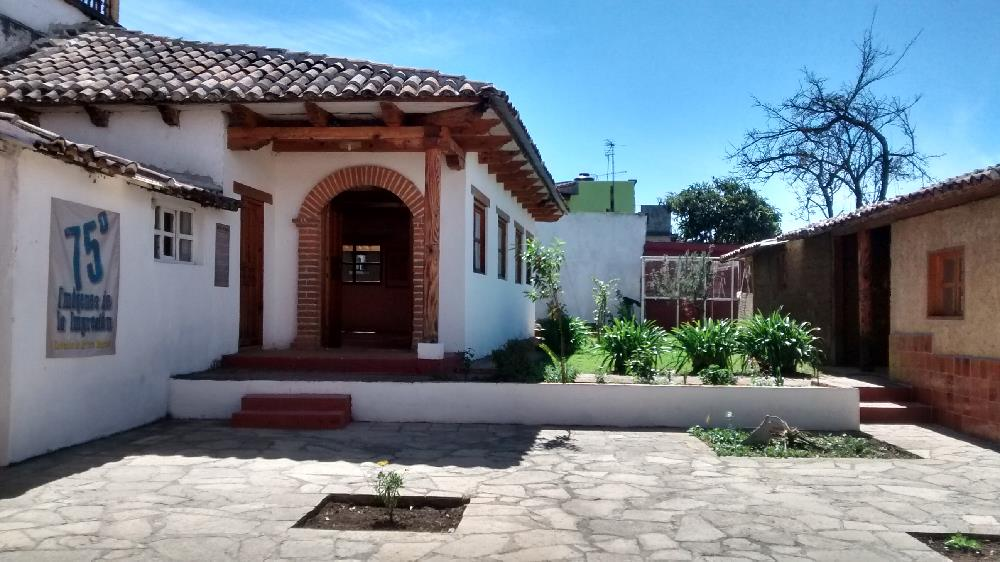
- Location: San Cristobal de las Casas, Chiapas, Mexico
- Coordinates: 16.73856°N 92.62879°W
- Type: indigenous peoples contemporary art gallery
- Founder: John Burstein
- Directors: John Burstein and Martha Alejandro Lopez
- Website: galeriamuy.org

Galería MUY (Espacio Artístico MUY, AC) is a nonprofit cultural space devoted to contemporary art by Maya peoples and Zoque people (being the two main ethnicities of indigenous peoples in Chiapas, Mexico). The name "MUY" comes from the Tzotzil language and is the root of the word meaning "pleasure". The cultural center is located in a clay house in a central neighborhood (Barrio de Guadalupe) in the city of San Cristóbal de las Casas and consists of a large patio, gallery spaces, a collection of over 150 Maya and Zoque artifacts, a residence house, a painting and ceramics production studio, and an archive of Maya and Zoque contemporary art, which is open to the public.

The MUY opened its doors in December 2014 and has since organized over 30 individual and collective art exhibits of Maya and Zoque creators. The MUY artists are among the top representatives of the indigenous people's contemporary art movement in Mexico.

This cultural center is co-directed by anthropologist John Burstein and artist and promoter Martha Alejandra López, a Zoque from Rayón Chiapas. The MUY has maintained an average of 4 exhibits a year every year since its opening in 2014.

Notable artists who have exhibited at the MUY include Cecilia Gómez, Darwin Cruz, and Gerardo K'ulej.

== Context ==
The state of Chiapas, known as a point of interest for anthropologists due to the presence of living indigenous cultures, is also the site of great exploitative industries (logging – written about by B. Traven – coffee plantations, dams, mining, and oil). It became a world-renowned hotspot for post-modern Indigenous autonomy – particularly since the Zapatista uprising, a historical event on a global scale. Espacio Muy originally responded to the need for Indigenous-specific non-governmental spaces where Maya/Zoque creators and intellectuals can debate and collectively enact the cultural aspects of the contemporary reformulations of traditionalist communitarian autonomy characteristic of the indigenous communities of Chiapas, and for which Chiapas has become a Mecca of social justice tourism for young Mexican and international short- and long-term visitors.

From the onset, it was framed not just as a space to showcase artists, but to be used as a headquarters and community center for these important debates and practices, as well as to provide employment to the different young artists and cultural workers who make up the team that runs the space. As stated by the artists themselves, the project has achieved its goal of supporting the needs of local indigenous artists and has therefore established itself as a cultural institution over the course of its first decade.

== Critical reception ==
Espacio MUY has been featured in prominent national newspapers like El Universal (Mexico City), La Jornada, and its artists' projects and exhibits have likewise been covered in different media outlets such as newspapers and art magazines. Art critic Ingrid Suckaer devotes a section to the Muy gallery in her book Arte indígena contemporáneo: dignidad de la memoria y apertura de cánones (Indigenous contemporary art: the dignity of memory and opening up of canons), published by Samsara Editorial in 2017.

Coinciding with the increasing interest in Indigenous art practices since the beginning of the century, the Muy has also engaged with major contemporary art museums such as Seminario 12, Museo Universitario Arte Contemporáneo,Palacio de Bellas Artes, and Museo Universitario del Chopo in Mexico City, as well as with curators such as Itzel Vargas Plata, to highlight the contemporary art production among the Maya and Zoque of Chiapas. The Muy and Muy artists have been invited to participate in prestigious international art fairs such as Material Art Fair, where it received the Hennesey Prize for Best Project the first year it participated, and Outsider Art Fair in Paris.

== Social Mission ==
The MUY is also recognized for its distinctive commitment to bringing art into Maya and Zoque communities. This includes the promotion of local exhibits of visual and performance art and especially the development of workshop model that combines low-tech local materials – in ceramics and textile – with modern technologies of digital film and social media-based practices, in a manner influenced by Situationist International, relational art, and theater of the oppressed.
