= MOI (file format) =

- Filename extension: .moi
- Type of format: Information

MOI is a computer file format used primarily to represent video metadata. MOI files are associated with MOD or TOD files whose content they represent. They are mainly used on JVC and Canon camcorders.

== Format overview ==
Hex offset (zero based)	Content	Example
00–01	Version	56 36 (V6)
02–05	MOI filesize (bytes)	00 00 01 C3 (451 bytes)
06–07	Year	07 D9 (2009)
08	Month	06 (June)
09	Day	1E (30th)
0A	Hour	0B (11)
0B	Minutes	16 (22)
0C-0D	Seconds	CB 20 (52000 milliseconds = 52 seconds)
0E-11	Video duration (ms)	00 08 9D 00 (564480 ms, 9 mn 24 s 12 frames)
80–83	Video aspect ratio and TV system	Low nibble of first byte: 0 and 1 for 4:3, 4 and 5 for 16:9. High nibble of first byte: 4 for NTSC, 5 for PAL.
84–85	Audio codec	00 C1 for AC3 audio / 40 01 for MPEG audio
86	Audio bitrate	01 = 64kbit/s (in steps of 16 kbit/s) to 0F = 640kbit/s
DA-DB	Video bitrate	58 96 = CBR 8.5 Mbit / 81 3D = CBR 5.5 Mbit
DD-E1	Video duration packets	Video duration (ms) (0E-11) * 5A + Video bitrate (DA-DB) (may be incremented with values at offset DA-DB, but may not be for VBR MPEG video)
E6-E7	Video bitrate	Same as at offset DA-DB
E9-ED	Video duration packets	Same as at offset DD-E1
F0-F1	COARSE table entries (zero based)	Count of 7 byte packets for coarse table (one 7-byte packet each 10 seconds)
F2-F3	FINE table entries	Count of 3 byte packets for fine table (one 3-byte packet each 480 milliseconds)
100 -	COARSE table	(F0-F1) * 7 byte packets coarse table
-	FINE table	(F2-F3) * 3 byte packets fine table
