= William Moise =

American painter

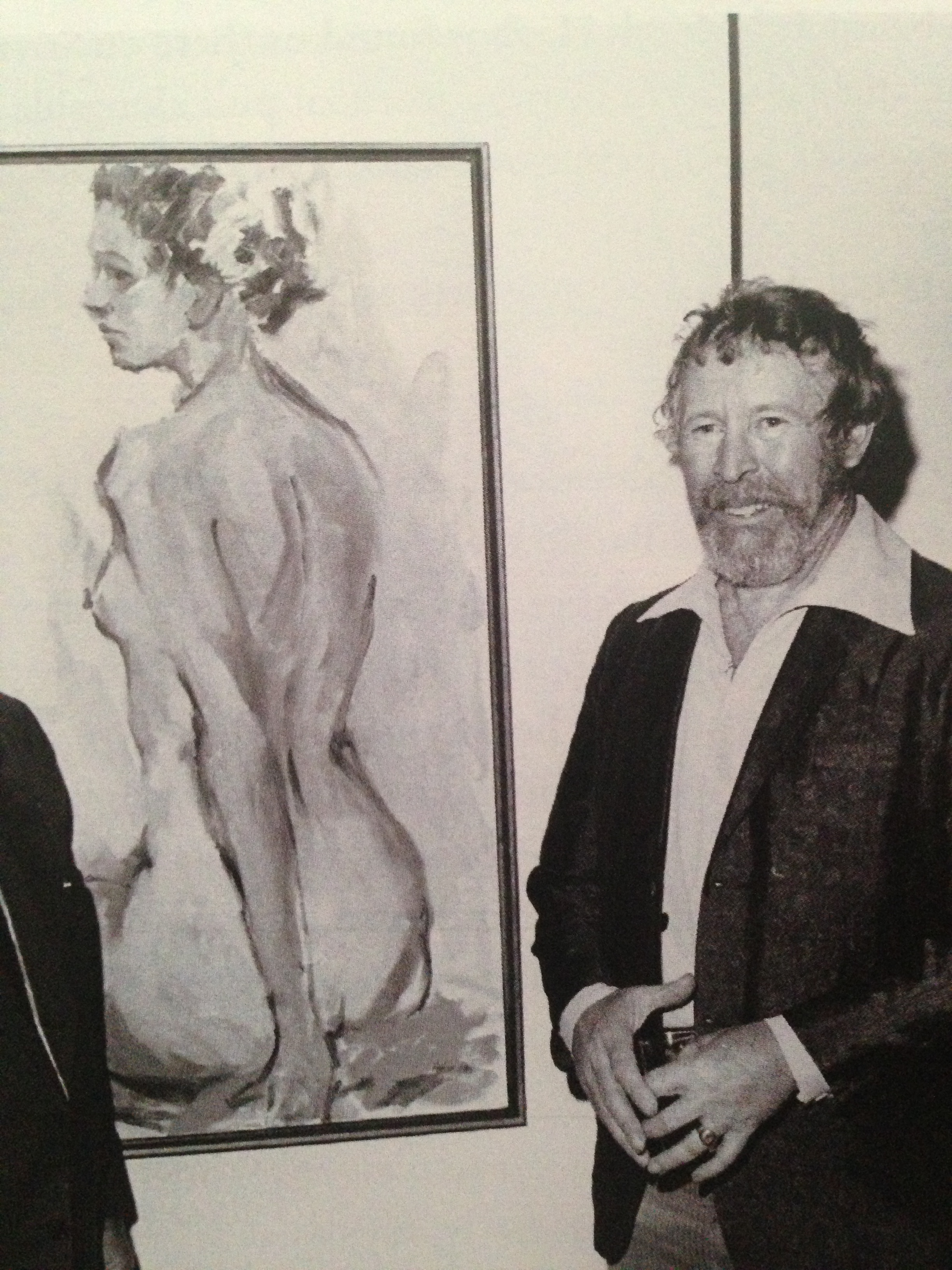
- Moise at a gallery opening in New York
- Born: 1922; Carlinville, Illinois, U.S.
- Died: 1980 (aged 57–58)
- Other name: William Sydney Moise

William Sydney Moise (1922–1980) was an American visual artist, primarily an abstract impressionist painter, working in a regionalist style.

In his art, as a plein air painter, Moise's favorite subject was the landscape around him, in Downeast, Maine. In 1970, Moïse wrote and self-published The Taste of Color, Touch of Love:The Creative World of Abstract Impressionism, a guide to painting that features 10 full color plates of his work. His paintings are among collections of the US State Department, The University of Maine, The College of the Atlantic, Movie Director Joseph E. Levine, Nelson Rockefeller.

== Biography ==
Moise was born and raised in Carlinville, Illinois. He grew up with three sisters and his mother. All of his sisters entered professional theater, and his mother worked as costume designer for the University in Tampa. Moïse graduated with a BA in English from the University of the South in 1943. He served as an anti-aircraft gunnery officer in the Navy in both the Atlantic and the Pacific. He attended Cooper Union Art School, New York. He went onto receive his MFA from Columbia University in 1949.

In 1950, Moïse moved to Rangeley, Maine to work as an assistant to Dr. Wilhelm Reich, the father of “body therapy" and discoverer of a life energy that Reich called "Orgone energy". In Maine, at Orgonon, he met his second wife, Reich’s daughter Eva Reich. They settled in Hancock on an old farm during the 1950s, where they raised animals, grew nearly all their own food, and Eva was a country doctor. Many of the cows, ducks, chickens and turkeys served as Moise's models, as well as sustenance. During that time, he initially taught art in the public schools of Mount Desert Island, then taught adult students privately in Bangor, Maine. Eva and Moise divorced in 1974.

After the divorce, Moise moved his painting studio from one end of the farm house to the other side of the barn, and he and Eva continued to share the same property. Moise used Wilhelm Reich's Cloudbuster weather device to both bring and push away rain for the garden, and to cause more beautiful conditions for painting (such as a snow storm instead of rain in the winter). They have one daughter, the midwife and artist Renata Moise, born in 1960. His grandson, (William) Chris Ross, is a well known musician in Maine.

In 1972, the movie director Joseph Levine and three investors offered Moise living expenses for three years in exchange for approximately 400 paintings (Moise retained several hundred of his most favorite paintings for himself). However, a 1961 painting of Renata in the Tulips, which hung over the family fireplace, was claimed in the deal by the investors. During the distribution of the paintings in Moise's middle barn (which he called the gallery), Levine, Erickson, Gosnell, and Kerr each took turns picking a painting. Kerr declared he didn't know anything about art, so he allowed Moise's preteen daughter to pick his collection- Moise claimed that Kerr got the best paintings. Eventually Gordon Erickson donated the bulk of his 100 paintings to The University of Maine in Orono ^{(7)}.

The paintings were premiered in a New York Gallery and Moise appeared on the comedy show Hee Haw and the Mike Douglas Show. But soon after the first gallery showing, investors lost interest and parted ways. In 1975 Moise and other artistic locals reopened the Crocker House Country Inn at Hancock Point, where during summers he bartended and greeted guests. It proved time consuming and took time away from painting; Moise had sold the Inn the year prior to his unexpected death.

Moise died at the age of 58 of a presumed heart attack in 1980 on the tennis court.

== Painting ==
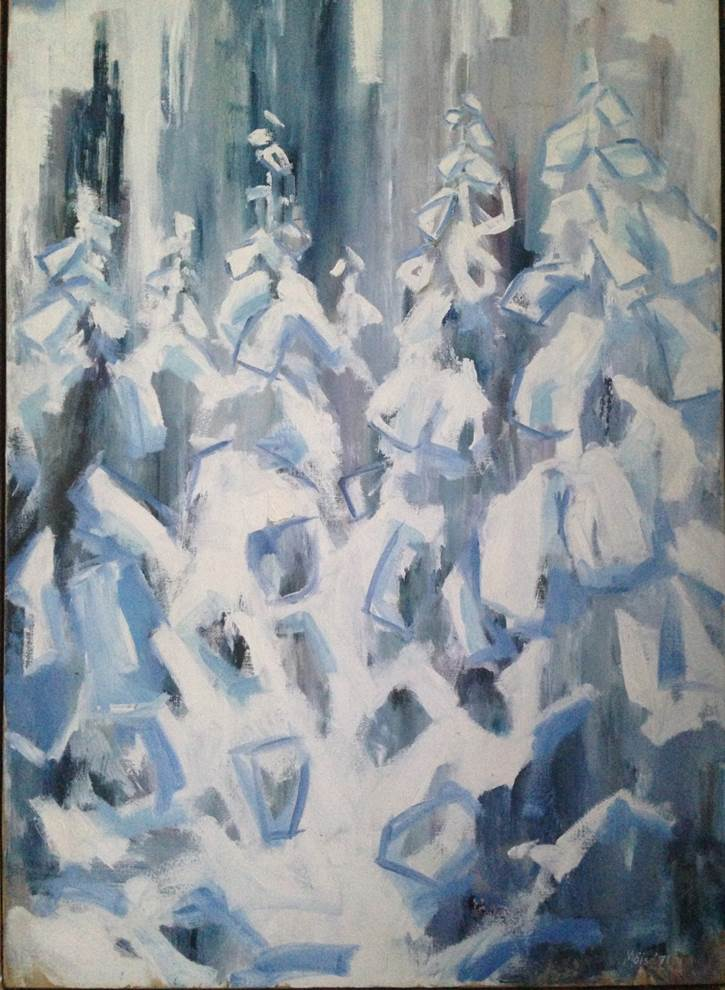
William Moise, 1971

One critic once said: ”Moise extends the line of the impressionists of a century ago, though his work is abstract, modern, not reactionary. Still his style embraces the perspective of Cezanne, the loveliness of Renoir, the emotionalism of Van Gogh, the vision of Monet”

== Bibliography ==
- The Taste of Color, Touch of Love: The Creative World of Abstract Impressionism (1970)
