= Moy House =

Moy House may refer to:

- Moy House, County Clare, an 18th-century house, now run as a hotel, in County Clare, Ireland
- Moy House, Moray, a ruined mansion in Moray, Scotland, designed by John Adam
