= Moyse Alcan =

Moyse Alcan (14 May 1817 – 15 May 1869) was a French Jewish poet and publisher.

== Career ==
Born in Verdun (Meuse), Alcan was the father of the Parisian publisher Félix Alcan (1841–1925). He was a member of the Israelite consistory of Metz and one of the judges of the Tribunal of Commerce. Alcan contributed to the Archives Israélites and the Revue d'Austrasie a number of poems, sonnets, and libretti of cantatas, such as Noéma (1841); Ruth (a Biblical hymn, dedicated to Carmoly, 1843), and Spartacus, a cantata performed at a public concert of the Société de l'Union des Arts at Metz in 1852 and at Damascus, 1860.

He died in Metz.
