= Matter Under Inquiry =

A Matter Under Inquiry (MUI, pronounced "muey", sometimes called Matter Under Investigation) is a term used by the United States Securities and Exchange Commission to describe preliminary investigations it makes into alleged financial fraud in the companies that it is responsible for regulating. MUIs may lead to more serious formal investigations, or they may be closed and no further action taken.

The procedures and rules for when and how to open and close MUIs are described in the agency's Enforcement Manual (which was first published in 2008), as well as other SEC memorandum In the 2000s (decade) era, any MUI that was not cancelled, automatically became an 'informal investigation' after a certain period of time. The American Spectator published an article in 2006 by Peter Wallison criticizing this practice, and arguing that it was too difficult for SEC employees to close investigations that it deemed unwarranted.

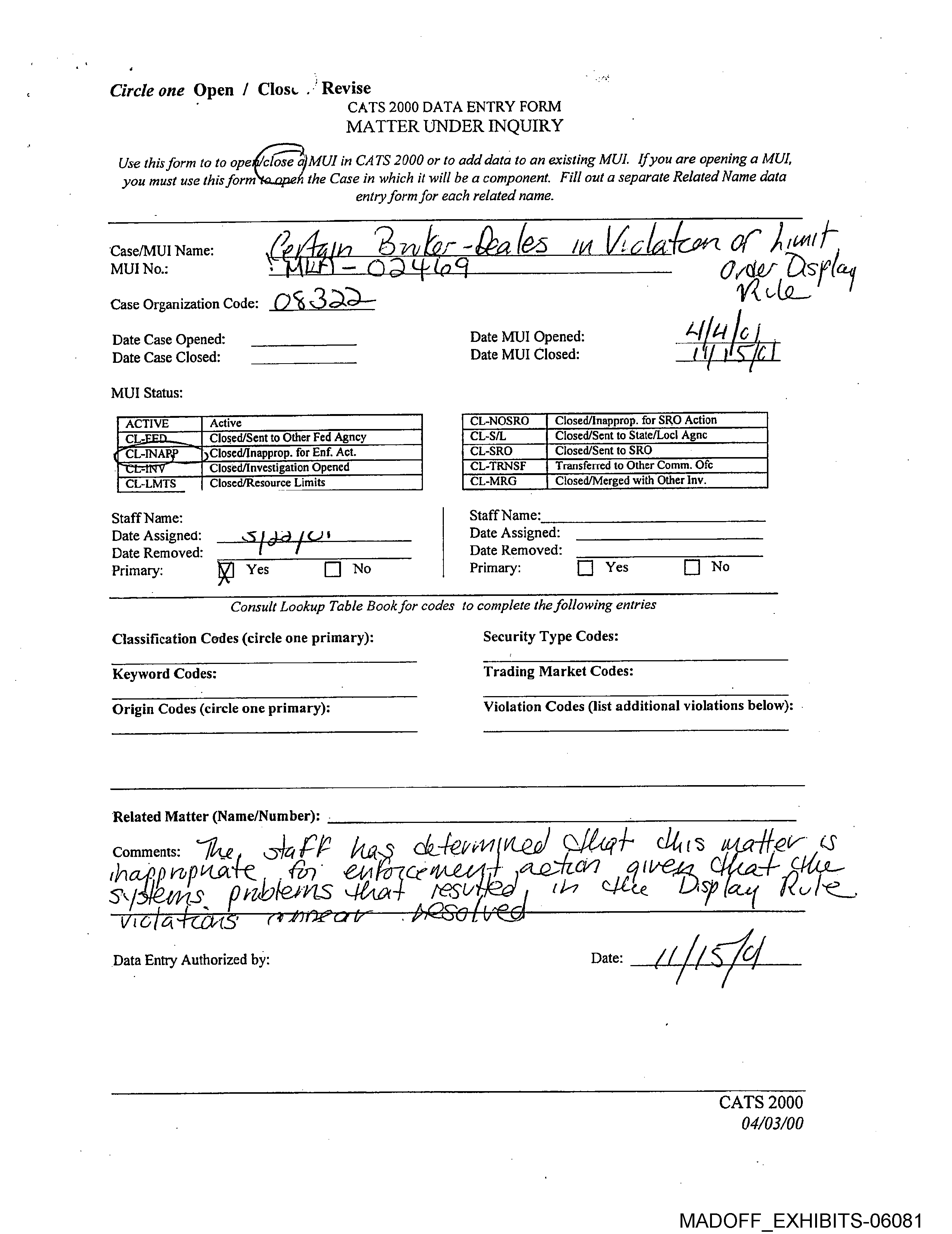
Form used to close a MUI. This particular example closed an investigation regarding Bernard Madoff, marking it "inappropriate for enforcement action"

MUIs are tracked in the SEC's computerized Case Activity Tracking System (CATS). Some information related to MUIs may also exist or have existed in the past in other SEC computer systems, such as the Super Tracking and Reporting System "STARS", the Name Relationship Search Index (NRSI), and the "Hub".

== Notable MUIs ==
MUIs are given "MUI number" codes, and also sometimes referred to by titles. Here are a few notable examples:

- MNY-07563, "Certain Hedge Fund Trading Practices" (Madoff case, SEC OIG report)
- MLA-02469, "Certain Broker Dealers in Violation of Limit Ord..." (Madoff case, SEC OIG report)
- MLA-01909, Goldman Sachs, alleged Market Manipulation
- MHO-09356, Deutsche Bank, alleged Insider Trading
- MHO-09432, Deutsche Bank, alleged Market Manipulation
- MNY-07013, Lehman Brothers, alleged Financial Fraud
- MNY-08198, Goldman Sachs, alleged Insider Trading
- MNY-08145, American International Group, alleged Insider Trading
- (code unknown) - 1998 Stanford MUI, alleged Ponzi scheme of Robert Allen Stanford

== Routine destruction of closed MUIs ==
After you have closed a MUI that has not become an investigation... you should dispose of any documents obtained in connection with the MUI

— Instructions to SEC employees on an SEC intranet

According to former SEC employee and whistleblower Darcy Flynn, as reported by Matt Taibbi in Rolling Stone in 2011, the agency routinely destroyed thousands and thousands of MUI documents related to investigations of alleged crimes committed by Deutsche Bank, Goldman Sachs, Lehman Brothers, SAC Capital, and other financial companies involved in the Great Recession that the SEC was supposed to have been regulating. The tradition of destruction began as early as the 1990s. This eventually caused a conflict with the National Archives and Records Administration when Darcy Flynn revealed the activity to NARA in 2010. Flynn also described a meeting at SEC in which top staff discussed refusing to admit the destruction had taken place because it was possibly illegal. The SEC claimed that it stopped destroying MUI documents in 2010.

== Position in SEC enforcement process ==
Chart from Government Accountability Office report

== See also ==
- Federal Records Act
- Market manipulation
- Senate Judiciary Committee
- Office of Inspector General
