= Ministry of propaganda =

Type of government ministry

A ministry of propaganda also known as agency, bureau or department of propaganda is the part of a government charged with generating and distributing propaganda.

Though governments routinely engage in propaganda, ministries or departments with the word "propaganda" in their name have become progressively rarer since the end of World War II, after the term took on its present negative connotation. Instead of using the word "propaganda", governments today often use the terms "public relations", "psychological operations", "education", "advertising", or simply "information".

== Examples ==
- The United Kingdom had the Ministry of Information during each World War.
- The United States had the Committee on Public Information for the First World War and the United States Office of War Information for the Second World War.
- Nazi Germany had employed Joseph Goebbels as head of the Ministry of Public Enlightenment and Propaganda.
- The Soviet Union had a Department for Agitation and Propaganda.
- The Republican faction in the Spanish Civil War had Ministry of Propaganda during period from November 1936 to May 1937.
- The Brazilian Estado Novo had a Department of Press and Propaganda (DIP).
- The Irish Republic had a Department of Propaganda, established 1918 and renamed to Department of Publicity in 1921.
- The Chinese Central Propaganda Department officially changed its English name to Central Publicity Department in 1998, while its Chinese name 宣传部 (Pinyin: Xuānchuánbù) was unchanged.
- Poland's ministry of information and propaganda was established in 1944.
- South Africa's President Jacob Zuma announced on 25 May 2014 a new Department of Communications responsible for all government communications and propaganda, echoing the role of the Department of Information under the apartheid government in the 1970s, whose diversion of government funds into propaganda was exposed in the Muldergate scandal.
- Fascist Italy's analogue was the Ministry of Popular Culture, created in 1933.
- The Ministry of Popular Power for Communication and Information in Venezuela is often called a propaganda ministry.
- The Propaganda and Agitation Department of North Korea is officially translated "Publicity and Information Department".
- Inter-Services Public Relations (ISPR) formed in 1947 in Pakistan – media wing of the Pakistani Armed Forces which broadcasts and coordinates military news and information to the country's civilian media and the civic society.
- During the Spanish Civil War, both sides of the conflict had a Department of Propaganda. Also, during the dictatorship of Francisco Franco, the Ministry of Information and Tourism acted as such.

== In literature ==
- The Ministry of Truth is the ministry of propaganda and censorship of Oceania in George Orwell's Nineteen Eighty-Four.

== See also ==
- Crowd psychology
- Ministry of Information
- Central Propaganda Department
