= Clara Moyse Tadlock =

American journalist (1840–1926)

Clara Moyse Tadlock (October 24, 1840 – July 14, 1926) was a British-born American poet and author known for her travel writing.

== Literary career ==
A native of Southampton, Moyse Tadlock emigrated to the United States in 1848 with her mother, sister, grandparents and uncle. She lived in Cincinnati, Ohio, before entering Westtown School in 1857. She later lived in Knoxville, Tennessee.

She married Alexander Tadlock in Bloomington, Illinois, in 1865. Their only child, son Thomas Lewis Tadlock, died within a month of his birth in 1866. The Tadlocks are buried at Knoxville's Lynnhurst Cemetery.

Moyse Tadlock authored two books, Solomon Grinder's Christmas Eve and Other Poems (1885) and Bohemian Days (1889). She also was a correspondent for The Maryville Times in Maryville, Tennessee, writing about her travels.

== Reception ==
In his bibliography of American travel literature, Harold Frederick Smith described Bohemian Days as "a woman's account of a pleasure tour around the world, west to east." Smalley's Magazine also reviewed the book, describing it as "a lively book of travel, which takes the reader around the entire circuit of the globe... the work is written in a chatty, feminine fashion, with little aid from guide books, and has the charm of a frank, personal narrative." Amanda B. Harris in Good Housekeeping wrote, "she saw many things that a woman would specially notice while a man would hardly see them at all."

== Selected works ==
- Moyse Tadlock, Clara (1885). Solomon Grinder's Christmas Eve and Other Poems. Boston, MA: D. Lothrop.
- Moyse Tadlock, Clara (1889). Bohemian Days. New York, NY: J. B. Alden.
