= Dick Price =

Co-founder of the Esalen Institute (1930–1985)

Richard Price
- Born: October 12, 1930; Chicago, Illinois
- Died: November 25, 1985 (aged 55); Big Sur, California
- Occupations: Manager, Esalen Institute; Gestalt practice
- Known for: Co-founder of Esalen Institute
- Spouse: Christine Stewart Price+
- Children: David and Jennifer

Richard Price (October 12, 1930 – November 25, 1985) was an American Gestalt therapist, co-founder of the Esalen Institute in 1962, and a veteran of the Beat Generation. He ran Esalen in Big Sur for many years, sometimes virtually single-handed. (Note: "Dick's life in the late 1960s was incredibly intense. Murphy had left Big Sur to live in San Francisco in 1967, leaving Dick to run the growing complexity of Esalen's Big Sur operations largely by himself." from The Only Way Out Is In p.152) (Note: "Differences in temperament would take the cofounders in very different directions as Esalen developed. Mike was always restless and sometimes a little uncomfortable in Big Sur. ... Dick, on the other hand, felt completely at home in Big Sur." p.149) He developed a practice of hiking the Santa Lucia Mountains and developed a new form of personal integration and growth that he called Gestalt practice, partly based upon Gestalt therapy and Buddhist practice.

Price consciously applied psychological principles to his sense of self, and helped many people work to do the same. His work remains at the core of the Esalen experience.

== Early life ==
Dick Price was born October 12, 1930, to Herman and Audrey Price in the Rogers Park section of Chicago, Illinois. Price had a twin brother, Bobby, who died in 1933, and a sister Joan who was born in 1929.

Price's father Herman Price (anglicised from Preis) was born in an Eastern European Jewish family in 1895. The family emigrated from Lithuania in 1911 (at that time a part of Russia), first to New York and finally to Chicago.

During World War I his father served in the United States Coast Guard, and then in the United States Navy. Herman was a refrigeration expert. He headed appliance manufacturing and design at Sears for their Coldspot brand, working extensively with Raymond Loewy, who was a close family friend. In 1936, the family moved into the two-floor penthouse apartment in at 707 W. Junior Terrace, just off Lake Shore Drive in Chicago. With the onset of World War II, Herman was loaned by Sears to the Douglas Aircraft Company where he applied his assembly line experience to organizing the mass production of aircraft, including the B-17 in particular. Although Herman was a charismatic businessman, he was an emotionally withdrawn and distant father for Dick.

Price's mother, Audrey (Meyers) Price was born in Indiana in 1895, and grew up in Auburn, Illinois. She was of Dutch, Irish and English heritage. Audrey was a domineering figure in the family, and a problematic and intrusive mother for Dick.

In 1941, the Price family moved to Kenilworth on the North Shore of Chicago. Dick graduated from New Trier High School in 1948. He joined New Trier's wrestling team and placed second in his weight class in the state of Illinois.

Dick Price died at age 55 when he was struck by a boulder while hiking near Esalen on November 25, 1985. He was survived by his wife, Christine Stewart Price, and two children, David and Jennifer Price.

== College education ==
Price graduated from Stanford University in 1952 with a major in psychology. While at Stanford, Price studied with both Gregory Bateson and Frederic Spiegelberg. They would later prove to be pivotal influences when he founded and developed programs at Esalen Institute. He did graduate work in the social relations department at Harvard University, although he left before completing his degree because of his frustration with the conservative, research-oriented faculty.

=== San Francisco ===
After leaving Harvard in 1955, Price enlisted in the Air Force and was given an assignment in the East Bay (San Francisco Bay Area). He rented a room in San Francisco at Alan Watts' and Frederic Spiegelberg's newly founded American Academy of Asian Studies (the precursor to the California Institute of Integral Studies). During this time, the North Beach Beat scene was an emerging social trend. Dick knew most of the primary figures, including Jack Kerouac, Allen Ginsberg, and Gary Snyder. Dick married his first wife, Bonnie, in a Zen ceremony.

=== Psychosis ===
In 1956, Price, still in the Air Force, experienced an episode of manic psychosis in San Francisco which he later described as simply "a state", what he believed was a mental break that was transitory and which he needed to go through and experience rather than repress or manage.

On December 7, 1956, his parents involuntarily committed him to the Institute of Living, an exclusive mental treatment facility in Connecticut. While hospitalized, he was misdiagnosed with schizophrenia. He was subjected to physical confinement and major tranquilizers, along with numerous electroconvulsive and insulin shock treatments. While committed, his mother had his marriage annulled. He was released almost a year later on Thanksgiving Day 1957.

Price wrote about his hospitalization experience:

There was a fundamental mistake being made and that mistake was supposing that the healing process was the disease, rather than the process whereby the disease is healed. The disease, if any, was the state previous to the "psychosis." ... The so-called "psychosis" was an attempt towards spontaneous healing, and it was a movement towards health, not a movement towards disease.... In some categories it would be called mystical, really a re-owning and discovery of parts of myself.

After he was hospitalized, he was discharged from the Air Force, and went to work for his uncle's sign company in Chicago, Price Brothers. Price never forgave his parents for their actions. Price did not like working for the sign company.

== Founding Esalen Institute ==
In May 1960, Price returned to San Francisco and lived in the East-West House with Taoist teacher Gia-Fu Feng. That year he also met fellow Stanford University graduate Michael Murphy at Haridas Chaudhuri's Cultural Integration Fellowship where Murphy was in residence. Dick moved into the Cultural Integration Fellowship as well. The two men conceived of the idea of a place where individuals could become open to ways of thinking while avoiding the dogma often associated with groups organized around a single idea promoted by a charismatic leader. In 1961, Murphy and Price visited the oceanside property in Big Sur, California owned by Murphy's family. The property included natural hot springs.

In 1962, using the Murphy property and capital that Dick had accumulated, along with assistance from Alan Watts, Aldous Huxley, Laura Huxley, Gerald Heard, Gregory Bateson and Frederic Spiegelberg (with whom both had studied at Stanford), Price and Murphy founded the Esalen Institute. Among other objectives, Price saw Esalen as an alternative to existing mental health practice, especially the practices of mental hospitals. Esalen was to be a place where inner process could move forward safely and without interruption.

Previously, the natural hot springs baths on the Murphy property were part of a run-down resort (known as Slate's Hot Springs). The security guard was a young Hunter S. Thompson. Joan Baez was also in residence. Thompson was soon fired by Murphy's grandmother, although Baez remained in residence through the beginnings of Esalen. Henry Miller regularly visited the hot springs during this early period of Esalen's history. In the middle of 1962, Abraham Maslow happened to drive onto the Esalen grounds and soon became an important influence on the development of the institute. Julian Silverman came to Esalen in 1965, in order to work on the schizophrenia project at Agnews State Hospital, and ended up serving as Esalen's general manager. Will Schutz came to Esalen in the 1960s and worked on aspects of his "encounter group" process. George Leonard, Joseph Campbell and Ida Rolf were among the many people who had an impact upon Esalen's development. In 1974, Price married his second wife, Christine Stewart Price, who became his primary collaborator at Esalen.

=== Altered state research ===
Price's interest in the expansion of human potentials led him to investigate many avenues of research, including the exploration of altered states of consciousness with psychotropic substances. In the early 1960s he experimented with LSD administered by a psychiatrist. Later he discovered that empathogens, such as MDMA, facilitated self-exploration and were helpful in psychological healing when used in conjunction with therapy.

In 1973, Price was instrumental in bringing Stanislav Grof to Esalen in the capacity of Scholar in Residence. Grof was interested in the enhancement of human potentials through the induction of non-ordinary states of consciousness. He had conducted research with LSD at the Psychiatric Research Center in Prague, followed by similar research at Johns Hopkins University and the Maryland Psychiatric Research Center. At Esalen, Price encouraged Grof to develop the therapeutic technique of Holotropic Breathwork, which functioned as a substitute for psychedelic drugs.

=== Gestalt practice ===
In 1964, Fritz Perls, the psychiatrist who developed Gestalt therapy, arrived at Esalen. During Perls' time at Esalen, Price became one of his primary students. He was also influenced by the work of Wilhelm Reich, who had been Perls' analyst. Price worked with Perls for approximately four years, from 1966 to 1970. During this period Price experienced a second brief manic break, arising from the unresolved trauma of his commitment. Perls declared this episode fully resolved and then told Price that it was time for him to start teaching Gestalt on his own.

During the time that Price ran Esalen, he educated himself widely in Western psychology and Eastern religions, including Buddhism and Taoism. He drew from the work of many teachers who came to Esalen over the years. Gestalt practice provided a humane approach that pulled together all these strands of ancient and modern knowledge into a coherent technique, similar to shamanistic methods of healing. This practice allowed Price to work with other people as real people, not as objects that needed to be "fixed" in some way. Throughout the 1970s and early 1980s, Price continued practicing, modifying, and teaching Gestalt at Esalen.

Price died in a hiking accident on November 25, 1985, when he was struck by a falling boulder. The method of Gestalt practice that Dick Price developed remains one of his most important achievements.

=== Hiking practice ===
Price would frequently hike the trails of the Santa Lucia Range, both for pleasure and for relief from the pressures of running Esalen Institute. This became a part of his process. Hiking was often a solitary practice for him, although he regularly took other people along. Sometimes he worked with them while hiking, doing Gestalt sessions that would turn out to be quite moving.

Steven Harper was one of Price's close friends and hiking partners at Esalen. Harper became a permanent resident of Big Sur and a leader of wilderness process groups at Esalen. After Price's death, Harper was also able to secure the official naming of two geographic features for Price. A very prominent ridge behind Esalen is now called Price Ridge, and a trail is named Price-Gagarin Trail after Price and his friend Andrew Gagarin.

== Legacy ==
In the time since his death, Price's work has remained influential. Along with his role in founding and guiding Esalen Institute, he influenced many people's lives with his work in Gestalt practice groups. (Note: "Dick's real legacy, however, was his gestalt work. In that work, he was able to help alleviate the suffering of countless others. Through his pain and suffering, Dick learned how to function as a powerful validating other in the lives of many people." from: The Only Way Out Is In: at p.160)

In 2013, during a period of management changes, Christine Stewart Price, the widow of Dick Price, decided to withdraw from teaching at Esalen Institute. She founded an organization named Tribal Ground Circle to continue Dick Price's work.

== See also ==
- Human Potential Movement
