= Lunch Wars =

2011 book by Amy Kalafa

Lunch Wars: How to Start a School Food Revolution and Win the Battle for Our Children's Health
- Author: Amy Kalafa
- Language: English
- Publisher: Tarcher
- Publication date: 2011

Lunch Wars: How to Start a School Food Revolution and Win the Battle for Our Children's Health is a 2011 book by Amy Kalafa, published by Tarcher. It is a book that advocates for more nutritious and healthier school lunches.

It is derived from a film made by Kalafa. The book contains instructions to parents on how to advocate for the book's goals.

== Contents ==
The first chapter, "Let’s Do Lunch," discusses six ingredients and additives which contribute to health issues. The second chapter, "Get Connected," discusses a 1920s onward movement for more healthful food. The National School Lunch Program is chronicled in the third chapter, "The Wonky Chapter." Initiatives in different layers of the government and their roles are discussed in the fourth chapter, "Local Wellness Policies." The fifth chapter, "Tipping Scales to Tipping Points," describes how management can contribute to changed nutrition in school meals. The gradual loss of nutrition in fruits and vegetables from the period circa 1961 to 2011 is chronicled in the sixth chapter, "Farm to Cafeteria." The seventh chapter, "Teach Food," states that experience with food is a way of combating "Nature Deficit Disorder". The eighth chapter, "Outsourced, stated that food services directly operated by school districts are more beneficial than food services run by outside companies. School initiatives in and outside the United States are described in the ninth chapter, "School food From Scratch."

== Reception ==
Publishers Weekly described the book as being "meaty" and "practical". Kirkus Reviews wrote that the book is "detailed" and "Painstakingly researched". Taylor Hunter of the Indiana University Maurer School of Law wrote that the work is "useful and comprehensive".
