= Harold C. Lyon Jr. =

American psychologist (1935–2019)

Harold C. Lyon Jr. (April 26, 1935 – November 9, 2019) was an American Guest Professor of Medical Education at LMU Munich in Germany, where he did research and taught physicians to be more effective teachers. He is known for his work as an educator and psychologist with focus on person-centered teaching and therapy. He was an author, educator, psychologist, and outdoor writer. Lyon was the author of 7 books and 150 articles on subjects including military strategy, leadership, education, multimedia, psychology, research, hunting, and fishing. He was a featured speaker about his outdoor books and articles at sport, fishing and hunting shows in New England and in Germany. He participated in research showing that interactive multimedia for teaching medical students clinical reasoning and diagnosis results in significant efficiency gains compared to traditional text material with the same content.

Lyon was a graduate of the U.S. Military Academy at West Point (BS), George Washington University (MA), and the University of Massachusetts (EdD). He was a former Ranger-paratrooper Army officer, serving in the 101st Airborne Division. As aide to the commanding general of the Second Infantry Division, Lyon was sent to Oxford, Mississippi, in 1962 to enforce the court orders to integrate James Meredith into the University of Mississippi and integrate the University of Alabama in 1963, against the wishes of Governor George Wallace. Lyon served as the first Director of Education for the Gifted & Talented in the U.S. Department of Education for eight years, Project Officer for the Federal role in the development of Sesame Street, assistant to the president of Ohio University, consultant to the White House Task Force on the Gifted and Talented, and has served on the faculties of Georgetown University as Distinguished Visiting Scholar in Psychology, Antioch College as Abraham Maslow Professor, Dartmouth Medical School as C. Everett Koop Fellow, Notre Dame College as Professor of Health Sciences, and the University of Massachusetts as Horace Mann Lecturer. He was a Fulbright Professor, a NIH Fogarty Senior International Fellow, and an Apple Fellow in Germany. He authored the White Paper for President Carter leading to the establishment of the U.S. Department of Education.

Lyon became an advocate for person-centered teaching and management while in the government and became friends with Carl R. Rogers and other Human Potential Movement leaders including Mosche Feldenkrais, Rollo May, Clark Mouskasas, Virginia Satir, George Leonard, Michael Murphy, David Aspy, and Chris Argyris, pioneers in person-centered education and psychology, many of whom he invited into Washington to give seminars in an attempt to influence more person-centered approaches among the Congressional staff. He came under criticism for his writings and advocacy from some conservative groups, including religious right groups and the John Birch Society, who attacked Lyon and humanistic education as being "anti-Christian" in their newsletter, which resulted in a number of Congressional inquiries to the then U.S. Secretary of Education, Ted Bell, who defended Lyon. Rogers, David Aspy, Lyon and other advocates began to move away from the less popular label "humanistic education" to call the movement "person-centered" teaching. Lyon was selected as the recipient of the Mensa Foundation Intellectual Benefits to Society Award in 2017.

On November 9, 2019, Lyon was killed in a boating accident on Lake Winnipesaukee in New Hampshire.

== Publications ==
- Learning to Feel – Feeling to Learn. Columbus, OH: Charles E. Merrill, 1971.
- It’s Me & I’m Here! New York: Delacorte, 1974.
- Tenderness Is Strength New York: Harper & Row, 1977.
- Angling in the Smile of the Great SpiritLaconia, NH, 2007. (Winner of the New England Outdoor Writers Association "Best Book of the Year Award.")
- On Becoming an Effective Teacher – Person-centered Teaching, Psychology, Philosophy, and Dialogues with Carl R. Rogers and Harold Lyon. New York: Routledge, 2013. ISBN 978-0-415-81698 4. (Co-authored with Carl R Rogers and Reinhard Tausch).
