= California Institute of Integral Studies =

Private, non-profit university based in San Francisco

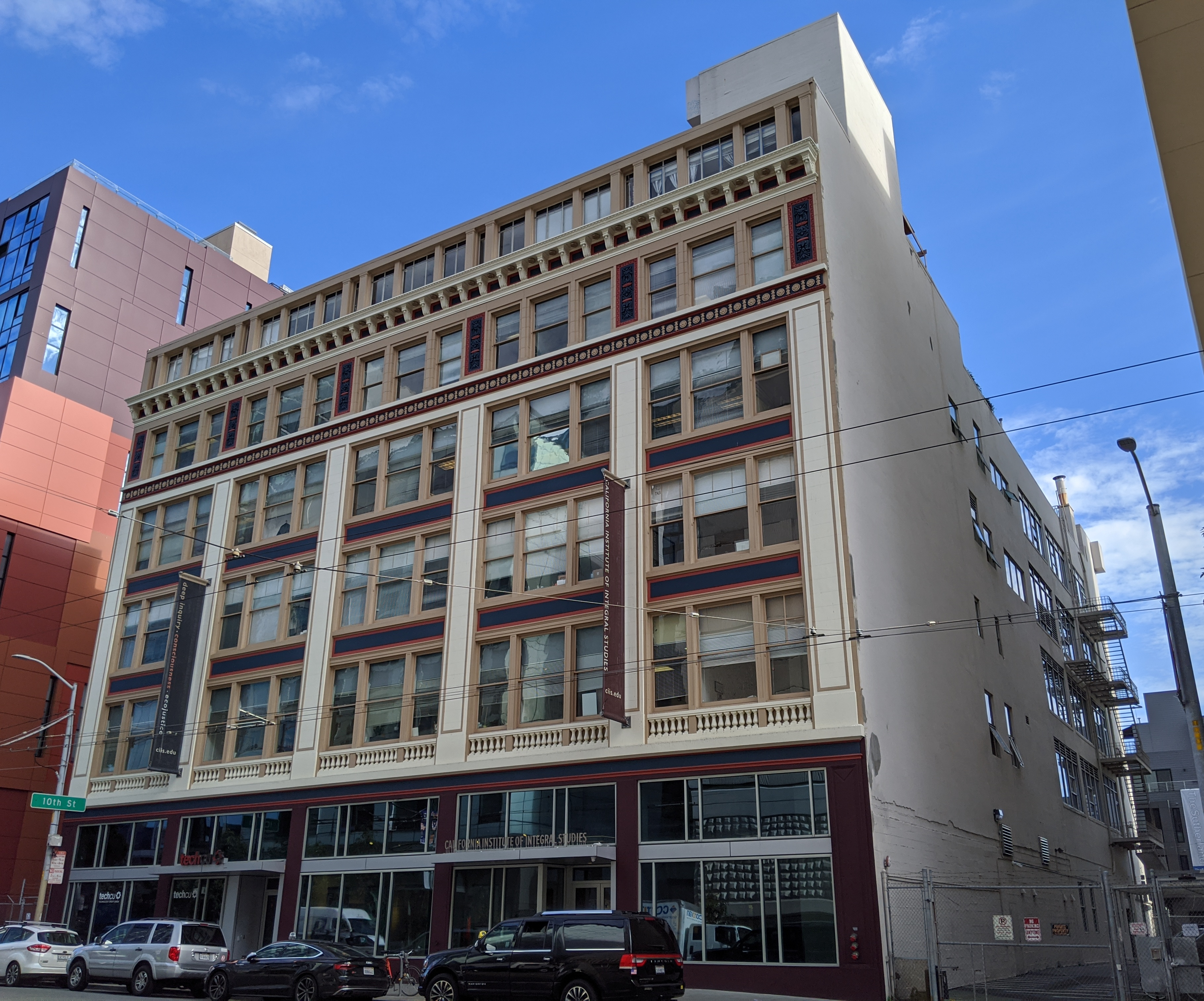
- The main campus building of CIIS (2020)
- Type: Private university
- Established: 1968; 58 years ago
- President: Brock Blomberg
- Students: 1,510
- Location: San Francisco, California, United States
- Website: www.ciis.edu

The California Institute of Integral Studies (CIIS) is a private graduate school (with limited undergraduate offerings) in San Francisco. Founded in 1968 as the California Institute of Asian Studies, the school adopted its current name in 1980. CIIS has been regionally accredited by the Western Association of Schools and Colleges since 1981.

While most programs fall into the general categories of psychology and spirituality, degrees offered range from "Anthropology and Social Change" to "Transformative Leadership" to "Psychedelic Studies." The term "Integral" in the school's name refers to Aurobindo's Integral Yoga (purnayoga), here interpreted as the integration of mind, body, and spirit.

Since 1999, the main location of CIIS has been in the SoMa area, on the border with the Civic Center and Mission districts.

== History ==
=== American Academy of Asian Studies ===
The original name, California Institute of Asian Studies, was inspired by the school's origins in the American Academy of Asian Studies (AAAS), founded 1951 by businessman Louis Gainsborough with Alan Watts an early participant. AAAS director Frederic Spiegelberg, a Stanford University professor and Aurobindo devotee, invited Indian philosophy professor and Aurobindo disciple Haridas Chaudhuri to the US, on the recommendation of Aurobindo himself.

Watts taught Buddhist, Taoist, and Hindu philosophy and religion, and established the AAAS as a meeting place for the countercultural movement known as the San Francisco Renaissance. Chaudhuri developed the field of integral counseling psychology, an integration of Indian philosophy with Western psychology. Others offering classes and lectures included C. P. Ramaswamy Iyer, Judith Tyberg, Rom Landau, Saburo Hasegawa, G. P. Malalasekhara, and Gi-ming Shien.

Graduate students included Michael Murphy and Dick Price, future cofounders of the Esalen Institute; Eugene Rose, the future Orthodox hieromonk Seraphim Rose; Gia-Fu Feng, who translated Chinese classics for Watts and would go on to write bestselling translations of the Tao Te Ching and Zhuangzi; and leading figures of the Beat Generation, including poet Gary Snyder. Price, Feng, and Snyder were among a core group of students that lived at the school. Jack Kerouac visited frequently, and based characters in The Dharma Bums on Watts and Snyder.

By 1952 the AAAS was in financial decline, after Gainsborough suffered serious business losses. For support and accreditation, the AAAS entered into an agreement to serve as the graduate school of Asian studies for the College of the Pacific. Spiegelberg stepped down, whereupon Watts operated the school on a shoestring budget for the next four years. The conservative college administration, dissatisfied with Watts' leadership, pushed him out in 1956.

Due to Watts' departure, a group of resident scholars led by Ananda Claude Dalenberg and including Shien, Feng, and Snyder also left the AAAS to found an intentional community called East-West House. There too, Kerouac's visits inspired characters for his books. Residents included Knute Stiles, Joanne Kyger, and other artists, poets and writers of the Beat Generation. Their lack of interest in the Academy added to the financial strain on the school, which closed within the year.

=== Cultural Integration Fellowship ===
Following the collapse of the AAAS, Chaudhuri and his wife Bina established the Cultural Integration Fellowship (CIF), an educational and meditation center based in a house on Fulton Street (across from Golden Gate Park, in the Inner Richmond District), and devoted to Aurobindo's integral philosophy and the practice of Integral Yoga. Meanwhile, the East-West House community maintained a connection with Watts, his Beat Zen, and later also Shunryū Suzuki and the San Francisco Zen Center.

Esalen Institute would feature seminars by both Chaudhuri and Watts. Esalen cofounders Murphy and Price first met at the CIF in 1960, despite both having previously attended the AAAS, and Spiegelberg's lectures at Stanford. Murphy had lived at the Sri Aurobindo ashram in India from June 1956 to October 1957, and was now living, meditating, and studying at the CIF house, where he invited Price to room with him. Within a year they established what would become Esalen Institute in Big Sur.

The Cultural Integration Fellowship developed an education branch that would evolve into a separate institution, while CIF itself would continue as a meditation, learning, and event center at the same location on Fulton Street well into the twenty-first century.

=== From CIAS to CIIS ===
In 1968, Chaudhuri led the founding and development of a new institution called the California Institute of Asian Studies, which grew out of the education branch of the Cultural Integration Fellowship and built upon the experience of the former American Academy of Asian Studies. Paul Herman continued the work of Chaudhuri and also designed the institute's first graduate degree in Integral Psychology, the Integral Counseling Psychology (ICP) degree, which was established in 1973. Spiegelberg served as the institute's second president, from 1976 to 1978.

In 1980 the Institute changed its name to the California Institute of Integral Studies, and was granted regional accreditation the following year. By the mid-1980s, available programs included clinical psychology, counseling psychology, and East/West psychology. Further programs in organizational development, external studies, and a transformation certificate program were launched in 1985–1986. Around this time, CIIS acquired an extensive library as well as the Integral Counseling Center, a community-based service facility that supported the training needs of clinical and counseling students. Obadiah S. Harris served as school president for a few years before succeeding Manly P. Hall as president of the Philosophical Research Society in Los Angeles (serving there 1990–2017).

In 2008, the San Francisco Chronicle reported that psychology students at the New College of California were transferring to the California Institute of Integral Studies, due to the closing of the former institution.

In 2012, CIIS, with support from the Aetna Foundation, announced that it was introducing its new onsite Health and Wellness Coaching program to San Francisco's Mid-Market District. The program was to be of benefit to children and families living at 10th & Mission Family Housing, a supportive housing project run by Mercy Housing California. Professor Meg Jordan published a case report in 2013 that summarized the experiences from the Integrative Wellness Coaching (IWC) project among homeless and low-income individuals in San Francisco. The IWC model was, at this time, included in the Master of Arts program in Integrative Health Studies at the California Institute of Integral Studies.

In 2015 CIIS acquired the American College of Traditional Chinese Medicine (ACTCM), but in 2021 following an external audit the CIIS Board of Trustees decided to close ACTCM by 2024.

== Philosophical background ==
Central to the early history of the institute is a model of so-called integral education. Originally set up to study Eastern culture and philosophy in the beginning of the 1950s, the Institute developed further in this direction with the arrival of Haridas Chaudhuri. Chaudhuri introduced the integral philosophy of Sri Aurobindo as a navigating principle for education and established a perspective that sought a holistic view of the human being; an integration of material and spiritual values; as well as an integration of Eastern and Western philosophies and worldviews. By the mid-eighties this model of education was firmly established. In 1985 Voigt reported on the graduate programs at CIIS and elaborated on the experience of integral education at the institute. In the late 1990s, CIIS was one of several institutions in the United States associated with the study of Holism and Consciousness.

There is also a connection between the roots of CIIS and the Human Potential Movement. Among the students who attended the colloquia at the American Academy of Asian Studies in the 1950s were Michael Murphy and Dick Price, founders of the Esalen Institute at Big Sur. According to Gleig and Floress, "one can trace a direct line from Integral Yoga through [the Cultural Integration Fellowship] to two of the major centers of the Human Potential movement and the transpersonal psychology field it birthed: Esalen and California Institute of Integral Studies (CIIS)."

Gleig and Flores further explain that:

CIIS's distinctive signature is the development of an integral education that combines academic scholarship with spiritual transformation and through its student body, faculty publications, and popular public program it has significantly shaped contemporary East-West spiritualities. As with the other main creative lineage centers – Esalen and CIF – CIIS is committed to a pluralistic spiritual vision and its Aurobindo roots are somewhat hidden.

According to Jim Ryan, CIIS, as developed by the founder (Chaudhuri), "had a very wide academic reach, far beyond its basic East-West philosophy concentration. Theses and dissertations were done over many years on the politics, economics, anthropology, sociology, and area studies of many nations of the world."

== Academics ==
CIIS consists of three schools: the School of Professional Psychology & Health, the School of Consciousness and Transformation (mainly humanities subjects), and the School of Undergraduate Studies.

The institute offers interdisciplinary and cross-cultural graduate studies in psychology, counseling, philosophy, religion, cultural anthropology, transformative studies and leadership, integrative health, women's spirituality, and community mental health. Many courses combine mainstream academic curricula with a spiritual orientation, including influences from a broad spectrum of mystical or esoteric traditions.

=== Accreditation and exam pass rates ===
CIIS is accredited by the WASC Senior College and University Commission.

In 2018, The Board of Behavioral Sciences (BBS), California's state regulatory agency responsible for licensing, examination, and enforcement of Licensed Marriage and Family Therapists (LMFTs), released statistics for its January 1, 2018 through June 30, 2018 exam cycle.

- CIIS examinees' pass rate was 82% (Standard exam), compared with a 77% pass rate for all schools in California.
- 83% of CIIS first-time Standard exam-takers passed, compared with an 80% pass rate for California schools overall.

The Doctor of Psychology (PsyD) program in Clinical Psychology is not accredited by the American Psychological Association (APA). The program received APA accreditation in 2003, but accreditation was revoked in 2011, and CIIS's appeal of the revocation was denied in 2012 on the basis that it was "not fully consistent with the Guidelines and Principles for Accreditation of Programs in Professional Psychology", notably "several requirements in the following areas: Domain B: Program Philosophy, Objectives, and Curriculum Plan; Domain C: Program Resources; Domain E: Student-Faculty Relations; Domain F: Program Self-Assessment and Quality Enhancement." CIIS applied for APA accreditation in June 2016, but voluntarily withdrew its application in June 2017.

== Notable people ==
- Angeles Arrien
- Robin S. Brown
- Dave Carter
- Haridas Chaudhuri
- Allan Combs
- Nadinne I. Cruz
- Angela Davis
- Stanislav Grof
- Andrej Grubacic
- Will Hall
- Stanley Krippner
- Judith Hanson Lasater
- Noah Levine
- Joanna Macy
- Robert A. McDermott
- Ralph Metzner
- Chani Nicholas
- Deborah Santana
- Starhawk
- Brian Swimme
- Richard Tarnas
- Judith Tyberg
- Douglas Vakoch
- Nick Walker
- Alan Watts
