= Derek Lin =

Taiwanese-American author

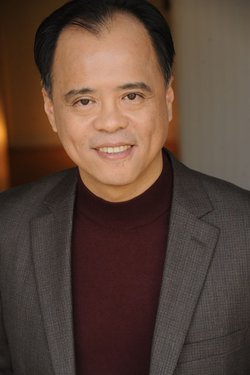

Derek Lin is a Taiwanese-American author in the Tao genre. He learned from multiple teachers in the Tao tradition, including Grandmaster Chen Deyang and Master Wu Han-Yih. He dedicated his book The Tao of Tranquility to Master Wu.

Lin translated and annotated the Tao Te Ching. His work is published by Skylight Paths Publishing in 2006.

Lin is also the author of four books published by the Tarcher imprint of the Penguin Group: The Tao of Daily life, The Tao of Success, The Tao of Joy Every Day and The Tao of Happiness, as well as three independently published books: The Tao of Wisdom, The Tao of Tranquility, and The Tao of Harmony. All of his books offer audiobook editions read by professional narrators.

Two of Lin's books have been translated into multiple languages:

- The Tao of Daily Life: Croatian, Russian, Turkish.
- The Tao of Success: The Five Ancient Rings of Destiny: Italian, Slovak, Bulgarian, Czech, Russian.

== Philanthropy ==
Lin offers his books to incarcerated individuals in the United States free of charge.

== See also ==
- Taoism
- Tao Te Ching
- Chuang Tzu

== Bibliography ==
Books by Derek Lin

- Tao Te Ching: Annotated & Explained. Skylight Paths; 2006. ISBN 978-1-59473-204-1.
- The Tao of Daily Life. Tarcher; 2007. ISBN 978-1-58542-583-9.
- The Tao of Success: The Five Ancient Rings of Destiny. Tarcher; 2010. ISBN 978-1-58542-815-1.
- The Tao of Joy Every Day: 365 Days of Tao Living. Tarcher; 2011. ISBN 978-1-58542-918-9.
- The Tao of Happiness: Stories from Chuang Tzu for Your Spiritual Journey. Tarcher; 2015. ISBN 978-0-39917-551-0.
- The Tao of Wisdom: Ancient Stories Bringing the Tao Te Ching to Life. Independent; 2021. ISBN 979-8-64876-035-6.
- The Tao of Tranquility: The Wisdom of Lao Tzu and the Buddha - Qingjing Jing. Independent; 2021. ISBN 979-8-53935-055-0.
- The Tao of Harmony: The Stories of Chuang Tzu and the Wisdom of Lao Tzu. Independent; 2026. ISBN 979-8-26374-701-5.

== Films ==
- With One Voice (2009)
- Eastern Mystics (2011)

== Awards ==
- The Tao of Success – 2011 COVR Award for Best in Print – Spirituality Category
- The Tao of Daily Life – 2008 COVR Award for Best Book – Spirituality Category
- The Tao of Daily Life – 2008 Nautilus Book Awards Silver Winner – Spirituality Category
