= Bahman Shirazi =

Bahman A.K. Shirazi is former director of graduate studies at California Institute of Integral Studies(CIIS). He has been actively affiliated with that organisation since 1983. His doctoral dissertation, "Self in Integral Psychology" was one of the first of its kind in the field of integral psychology. His work draws from the approach of Haridas Chaudhuri, focusing on an integrative approach to psychology, with the goal of developing insights into the nature of human psychospiritual development and integral self-realization. He has taught at several San francisco Bay Area Universities: Californian Institute of Integral Studies (CIIS), Sofia University (formerly Institute of Transpersonal Psychology), and previously at John F. Kennedy University(JFKU), and Dominican University of California.

== Partial bibliography ==
- Shirazi, Bahman (2025)Can Sri Aurobindo's Integral Epistemology Bridge the Gap Between Science and Spirituality? Śraddhā Journal, Vol.16, No.3, February, 2025.
- Shirazi, Bahman (2025). Ego as the Helper: Healthy Ego Development in Integral Psychology. Collaboration Journal, Vol. 50, Issue 1, Spring 2025.
- Shirazi, Bahman (2023). The American Soul: Its Essential Qualities and Future Possibilities. Collaboration Journal, Vol. 47, No. 3 Fall/Winter 2023.
- Shirazi, Bahman (with Pravir Malik)(2022). Cosmology of Light: Bridging Science and Spirituality Collaboration Journal, Vol. 47 No. 1 Spring 2022.
- Shirazi, Bahman (2021). Life’s Big Questions: An Interview with Phillip Goldberg. Collaboration Journal Vol. 46, No. 1 Spring 2021.
- Shirazi, Bahman (2018). Haridas Chaudhuri's contributions to integral psychology. International Journal of Transpersonal Studies, Vol. 37, No 1. http://dx.doi.org/https://doi.org/10.24972/ijts.2018.37.1.55
- Shirazi, Bahman (2016). Aids and Obstacles in Integral Yoga. Collaboration, Vol. 41, No. 2, Fall 2016.
- Shirazi, Bahman (2015). Integrative Research: Integral Epistemology and Integrative Methodology. Integral Review Vol. 11, No. 1, February 2015.
- Shirazi, Bahman (2013). The Metaphysical Instincts & Spiritual Bypassing in Integral Psychology. Integral Review, Vol. 9, No. 3, September 2013.
- Shirazi, Bahman (2012). Rethinking the Future of World Religion: An Interview With Jorge N. Ferrer. Integral Review, Vol. 8, No. 1, July 2012.
- Shirazi, Bahman (2011). Integral Education: Founding Vision and Principles. Integral Review, Vol. 7, No. 1, June 2011.
- Shirazi, Bahman (2010). Wholeness, Integration of personality, and Conscious Evolution in Integral Psychology. ReVision Journal, Vol. 32, No. 1, Spring 2010.
- Shirazi, Bahman (2010). The Sufi Path of Self-transformation. in Cornelissen, Matthijs, Mishra, Girishwar, and Varma, Suneet (Eds.) Foundations of Indian Psychology, volume one. New Delhi: Pearson Publications.
- Shirazi, Bahman (2005). Integral Psychology: Psychology of the Whole Being. In Consciousness & Healing: An Anthology of Integral Medicine Editors: Marilyn Schlitz, Ph.D., Tina Amorok, MA, Psy.D cand. & Marc Micozzi, MD, Ph.D., 2005).
- Shirazi, Bahman (2004). Transformation of Consciousness in Sufism. Psychology: Traditional, Spiritual, contemporary Vol.1, No. 3, Spring 2004.
- Shirazi, Bahman (2004). Dimensions of Integral Psychology. In Unity in Diversity: Fifty years of cultural integration and more. San Francisco, CA: Cultural Integration Fellowship, 2004.
- Shirazi, Bahman (2001) "Integral psychology, metaphors and processes of personal integration", Cornelissen, Matthijs (Ed.) Consciousness and Its Transformation, Pondicherry:

Editing

Editor: Special Issue of Integral Review, Vol. 11, (#1), February 2015 https://web.archive.org/web/20150730134747/http://www.integral-review.org/back_issues/backissue20_Vol11No1/index.asp

Editor: Special Issue of Integral Review, Volume 9 (#3), September 2013 https://web.archive.org/web/20150322140626/http://integral-review.org/back_issues/backissue18_Vol9No3/index.asp

Editor: Special Issue of Integral Review, Vol. 8 (#1), July 2012 https://web.archive.org/web/20150322140626/http://integral-review.org/back_issues/backissue18_Vol9No3/index.asp

Editor: Special Issue of Integral Review, Vol. 7 (#1), June 2011 https://web.archive.org/web/20150701182200/http://integral-review.org/back_issues/backissue13_Vol7No1_CIIS/index.asp

Editor: Special Issue of ReVision Journal, Vol. 32 (#1), Spring 2010

Audiovisual Media

Associate Producer: Integral Consciousness. Documentary Film. Director, Mark Kitchell. Alan Baiss (producer) ©2008
