= Debashish Banerji =

Integral yoga scholar and art historian

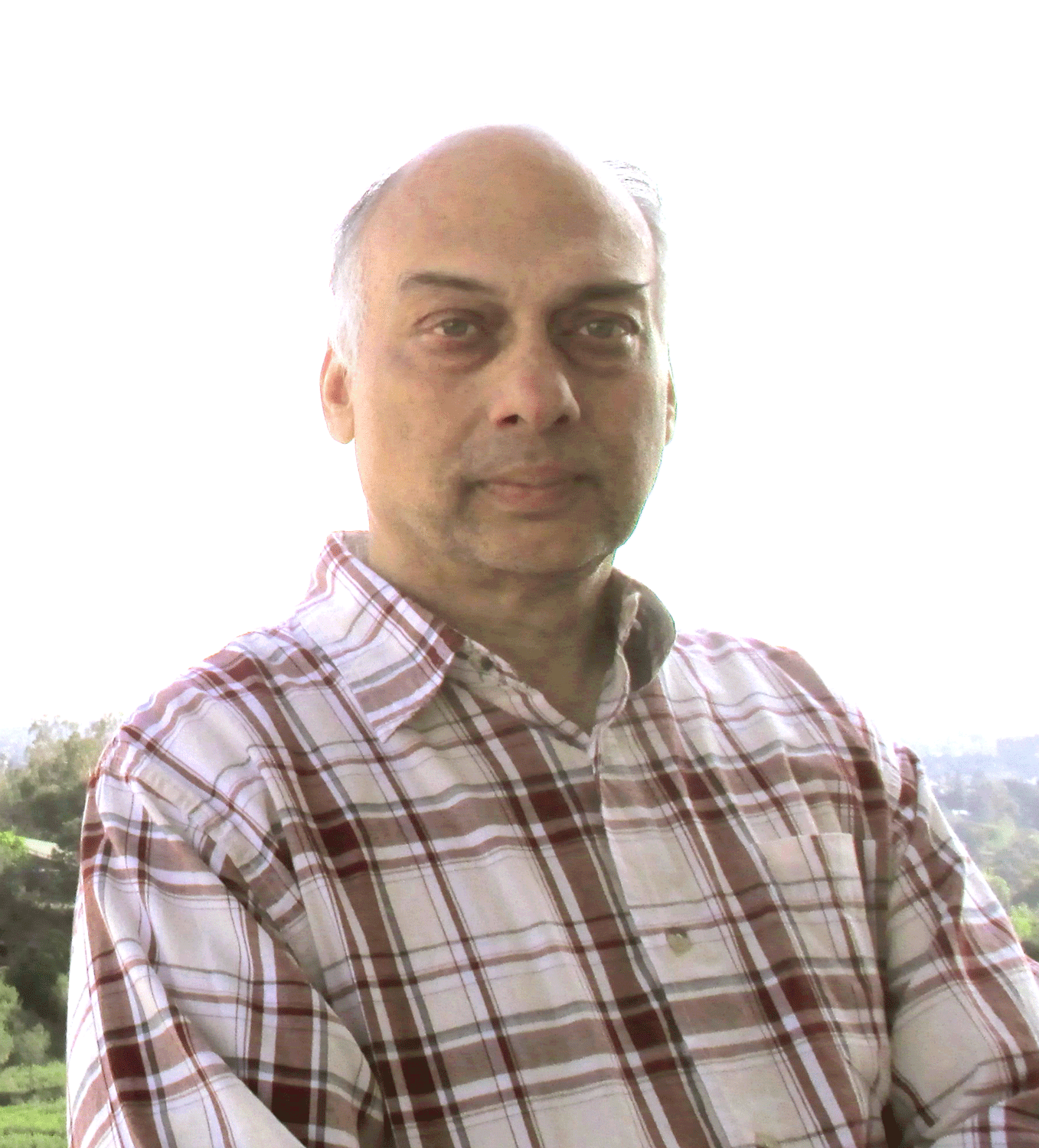
- Debashish Banerji at the Getty Center, Los Angeles in May 2015
- Born: Kolkata, West Bengal, India
- Citizenship: United States
- Education: University of California, Los Angeles (PhD); University of Louisville, Kentucky (MS)
- Known for: Writings in Integral Yoga, Art History
- Website: debashishbanerji.com

Debashish Banerji is a Bengali scholar. He writes in English and specializes in Integral Yoga, Indian Philosophy and Psychology, Art History and Cultural Theory. He is the Haridas Chaudhuri Professor of Indian Philosophies and Cultures and the Doshi Professor of Asian Art at the California Institute of Integral Studies, San Francisco, where he also chairs the department of East-West Psychology.

Banerji has worked on the philosophy and psychology of 20th c. yogi-philosopher Sri Aurobindo (1872–1950), as well as on the Indian artist Abanindranath Tagore (1871–1951), of whom he is a great-grandson. He has also worked on Critical Posthumanism and 20th c. Indian nationalism, as manifest in the Bengal Renaissance.

== Education ==
Banerji received his PhD in Art History from the University of California, Los Angeles (UCLA). Before that he completed his M.S. in Computer Science at the University of Louisville, Kentucky.

== Career ==
- Banerji is currently teaching Yoga Psychology and Art History at the California Institute of Integral Studies, San Francisco. Previously he has taught Art History at Pasadena City College, University of California, Los Angeles, University of California, Irvine. He also taught Indian Philosophy at the University of Philosophical Research, Los Angeles (owned under The Philosophical Research Society, Los Angeles).
- He has also curated exhibitions of Asian art at academic galleries such as Loyola Marymount University, Laband Art Gallery and Pasadena City College Art Gallery, Pasadena, CA.
- From 1991 to 2005, Banerji was the president of the East-West Cultural Center in Los Angeles, which was founded by Judith Tyberg, to introduce the teachings of Sri Aurobindo in the U.S.

== Authored and edited books ==
- Banerji, Debashish (2012). Seven Quartets of Becoming : A Transformational Yoga Psychology Based on the Diaries of Sri Aurobindo. New Delhi: Nalanda International and D.K. Printworld. ISBN 978-8124606230. In this book Banerji discusses the seven lines of yoga practice constituting the integral yoga followed by Sri Aurobindo.
- Banerji, Debashish (2020). Meditations on the Isha Upanishad: Tracing the Philosophical Vision of Sri Aurobindo (First ed.). Kolkata, India: Maha Bodhi. ISBN 978-93-84721-47-3. Here Banerji discusses the paradoxical goal of becoming expressed in the Isha Upanishad in its relevance for the personal practice and teaching of Sri Aurobindo.
- Banerji, Debashish (2010). The Alternate Nation of Abanindranath Tagore. New Delhi: SAGE. ISBN 978-8132102397. This is a historical and cultural study of significant series of paintings by the modern Indian artist as responses to colonialism, modernity and nationalism.
- Banerji, Debashish; Paranjape, Makarand R., eds. (2016). Critical Posthumanism and Planetary Futures. New Delhi, India: Springer. ISBN 978-81-322-3635-1. An edited anthology of essays covering posthumanism in its diverse implications such as technology, politics, feminism, animal studies, postcoloniality and spirituality and indicating its dangers and possibilities for the future.
- Banerji, Debashish, ed. (2020). Integral Yoga Psychology: Metaphysics & Transformation as Taught by Sri Aurobindo. Twin Lakes, WI: Lotus Press. ISBN 9781608692392. An edited collection of essays attempting to establish the field theoretically and methodologically as a domain of contemporary transpersonal psychology.
- Banerji, Debashish, ed. (2014). Rabindranath Tagore in the 21st century : Theoretical Renewals. New Delhi: Springer. ISBN 978-81-322-2037-4. An edited anthology evaluating the various expressions of the Bengali poet, essayist, novelist, songwriter, dramatist and educator in terms of their contemporary relevance.

== Reception ==
- Banerji's authored book Seven Quartets of Becoming: A Transformative Yoga Philosophy Based on the Diaries of Sri Aurobindo has been reviewed in International Journal of Dharma Studies. In the words of the reviewer Jon L Dorbolo, "Banerji's analysis lays a groundwork for new scholarly approaches to Sri Aurobindo's integral yoga which may lead to increasing significance of it within the traditions of both Indian and Western thought."
- Another authored book by him The Alternate Nation of Abanindranath Tagore has been reviewed in caareviews.org. In the words of the reviewer Julie Romain, "Banerji's book fills a lacuna in scholarship of early modern South Asian artists as well as establishes a dialogue with previous studies of the Bengal School".
- Meditations on the Isha Upanishad: Tracing the Philosophical Vision of Sri Aurobindo, authored by Banerji has been reviewed in the Journal of Dharma Studies by Alicia K. Gonzales. In her words: "Debashish Banerji has risen to become a leading expert on modern India's visionary spiritual pioneer Sri Aurobindo, as well as on his applied philosophy, called integral yoga (pūrṇayoga in Sanskrit)."
- His edited book Integral Yoga Psychology: Metaphysics & Transformation as Taught by Sri Aurobindo has been reviewed in Sophia journal. In the words of the reviewer, Robert A. McDermott, "This volume will increasingly be regarded as the foundational study for the integration of Integral Yoga and psychology. It is also likely to be regarded as a methodological guidebook towards academic study and research on the psychology of yoga traditions, locating them in the opening made possible by transpersonal psychology."
- His edited book Critical Posthumanism and Planetary Futures has been reviewed on the p2pfoundation website. According to the editor: "The essays in this volume offer leading-edge thought on the subject, with special emphases on postmodern and postcolonial futures."

== Talks and interviews ==
- Banerji's talk Ethics, Sustainability and Sri Aurobindo's Integral Advaita delivered in August, 2015 at the Cultural Integration Fellowship, San Francisco, developed the relevance of integral yoga to the contemporary global crisis. According to the editor, "While the practice of Sri Aurobindo's yoga has been largely conceived as being "beyond ethics" and focused on individual spiritual attainment, this attitude has amply revealed its dangers... By revisiting the Vedantic basis of Sri Aurobindo's philosophy (darshan), this talk reconceptualizes his yoga in terms of an ethical and environmentally sustainable praxis."
- His talk Shakti, Bhakti, Yoga and Darshan: Practice and Experience in the Religious Art of India delivered in 2016 at the Santa Barbara Museum of Art and carried in Sutra Journal, developed the relationship between Indian art and yoga. In the words of the editor of Sutra journal: "This talk traces a historical path through the early visual culture and texts of India to derive the conventions of later Indian art and the experiential practices relating them to their followers."
- In 2020, he was interviewed for the Posthumans Vlog, by posthumanism scholar Francesca Ferrando, on the topic of "Existential Posthumanism, Wisdom, Yoga & PostColonialism," where he developed the idea of yoga as a technology of posthuman becoming.
- He is a frequent guest on video interview series New Thinking Allowed, where he has made original contributions to integral yoga psychology, the Bengal renaissance and posthumanism.

== Awards ==
- In 2017, Banerji received the Sri Aurobindo Puraskar Award for international excellence in Sri Aurobindo studies from the Sri Aurobindo Bhavan, Kolkata.
- His book on the yoga psychology of Sri Aurobindo titled Seven Quartets of Becoming: A Transformational Yoga Psychology Based on the Diaries of Sri Aurobindo, received the DANAM (Dharma Academy of North America) Book Award for Constructive Philosophy in 2014.
