= Slates Hot Springs =

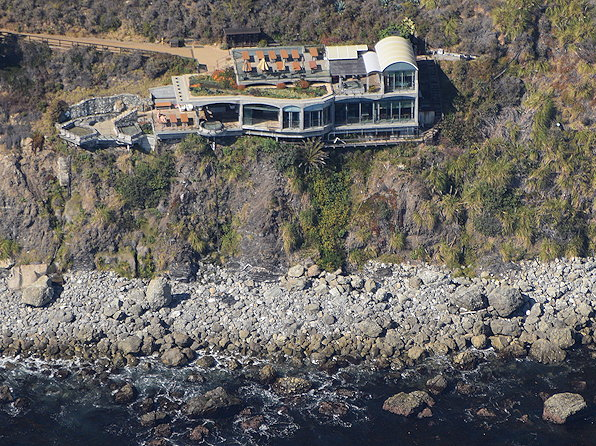
- Aerial view of Slate's Hot Springs and Esalen Institute, 2015

- Location in California Slates Hot Springs (the United States)
- Coordinates: 36°07′25″N 121°38′14″W
- Country: United States
- State: California
- County: Monterey County
- Elevation: 118 ft (36 m)

Slates Hot Springs (also known as Big Sur Hot Springs, Slate's Hot Springs, Slate's Springs, and Slate's Hot Sulphur Springs) is the site of a hot spring in the Big Sur region of Monterey County, California. It is located 8 miles (13 km) north-northwest of Lopez Point, at an elevation of 118 feet (36 m).

Thomas B. Slate filed a land patent for the site and adjacent land on September 9, 1882. He built a home on the site of the springs in 1868 and developed the springs for tourists. He claimed that the waters cured him of arthritis and it attracted others seeking a cure for their physical ailments. He sold the property to Salinas physician Dr. Henry Cloyd Murphy in 1910, whose family owned it until 1967, when Michael Murphy and Dick Price bought it from the estate of Michael's grandmother, Vinnie McDonald Murphy. They incorporated the business as Esalen Institute.

== History ==
=== Native people ===
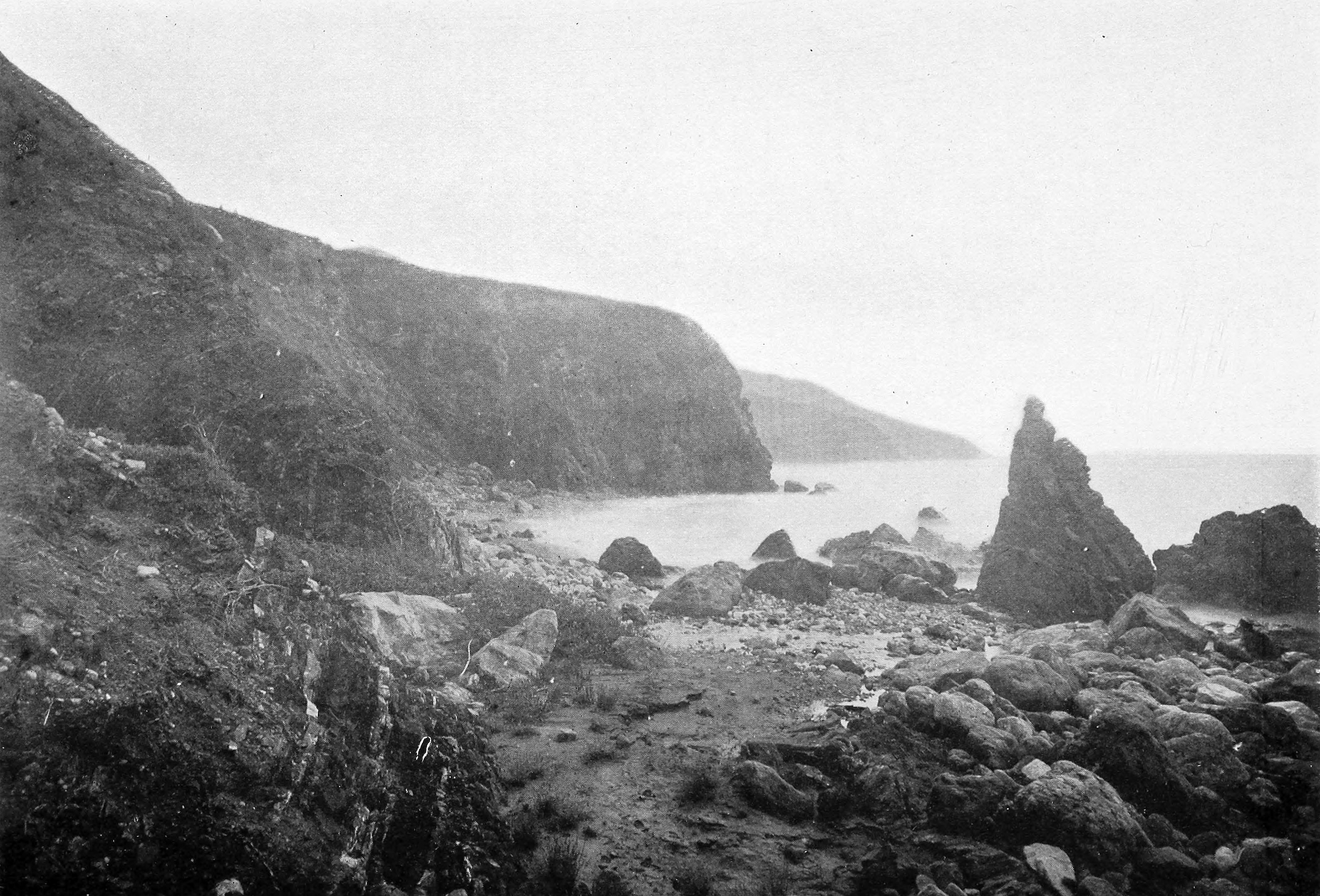
Coast at Slates Hot Springs, 1900

The Esselen people resided along the upper Carmel and Arroyo Seco Rivers, and along the Big Sur coast from near present-day Hurricane Point to the vicinity of Vicente Creek in the south, including Slate Hot Springs. Carbon dating tests of artifacts found near Slates Hot Springs, presently owned by Esalen Institute, indicate human presence as early as 3500 BC. With easy access to the ocean, fresh water and hot springs, the Esselen people used the site regularly, and certain areas were reserved as burial grounds. The coastal Santa Lucia Mountains are very rugged, making the area relatively inaccessible, long-term habitation a challenge, and limiting the size of the native population.

The Esselen population was largely decimated when they were forcibly relocated to three Spanish missions: Mission San Carlos in Carmel, Mission Nuestra Señora de la Soledad in Soledad, and Mission San Antonio de Padua in Jolon. Without resistance to European disease, large numbers died from measles, smallpox, and syphilis, along with starvation, overwork, and torture. This wiped out 90 percent of the native population. Today, a few people in the area can still trace their ancestry to the Esselen and they maintain a relationship with Esalen Institute.

=== Homesteading ===
In the 1870s, Thomas Slate visited the Big Sur site to use the hot springs because he suffered from severe arthritis. On September 9, 1882, he filed a land patent under the Homestead Act of 1862. The settlement began known as Slates Hot Springs. It was the first tourist-oriented business in Big Sur, frequented by people seeking relief from similar afflictions.

In 1918, the California State Mining Bureau issued a report from the state mineralogist about the springs and their properties. According to the report,

Slates Hot Springs is the southernmost of the four groups of hot springs in coastal Monterey County. In 1918, J. A. Little owned the site. The water there issued at ten principal points in a distance of 125 yards (114 m), halfway up the face of the bluffs that here border the ocean. A small private bathhouse has been built near the easternmost spring. The waters range in temperature from 110 °F (43 °C) to 121 °F (49 °C), are mildly sulphuretted, and the run-off streams are lined with abundant green algous growth. Small deposits of alum, gypsum, and carbonate of lime or magnesia were noted at the edge of one spring. The waters taste distinctly sweetish.

About 0.25 miles (0.4 km) northwest of the main group, on the left bank of Hot Creek, is another spring, 98 °F (37 °C) in temperature. This spring yields perhaps 5 US gallons (19 L) a minute and was in 1918 used for laundering clothes.

It is said that the location of the springs was described by an Indian to Thomas B. Slate, who made his way southward with difficulty along the steep, brushy slopes, and succeeded in finding only the warm spring beside the creek. Later, however, he came down the coast in a boat, found the springs on the bluff, and settled near them in 1868. The locality is occasionally made a camping place by deer hunters, but as of 1918, it is about 17 miles (27 km) by trail beyond the southern end of the wagon road, it was not often visited.

The formation exposed along the bluffs is of slates that have been described as being probably of Jurassic age. They are overlain by 30 to 40 feet (9.1 to 12.2 m) of gravel that is deposited on an ocean terrace along this portion of the coast. The heated water apparently emerges at the base of the gravel, though small warm flows also issue from the slate, close to the surf. It is said that when garden land on the terrace back of the springs has been irrigated for several weeks by a mountain stream the seepage water has so reduced the temperature of the hot springs that they are only tepid.

=== Murphy family ===
In 1910, the land was purchased by Henry Cloyd Murphy, a Salinas, California, physician. Murphy bought the property with the intention of opening a European-style health spa, when the yet-to-be-built Highway 1 was completed. Before the Carmel-San Simeon Highway was completed, the springs site was used by engineers and others involved with the construction. The highway was opened in 1937 but gas rationing and a ban on recreational driving during World War II severely limited visitors. After the war ended, the resort was managed by a series of property managers. A restaurant was available and the hot springs baths were open to paid use.

The official business name was "Big Sur Hot Springs", although it was more generally referred to as "Slate's Hot Springs". In 1924, John and Julia Pfeiffer Burns leased pasture land from former U. S. congressman Lathrop Brown at Saddle Rock Ranch, near McWay Falls, on land they later donated to the state that became Julia Pfeiffer Burns State Park. They lived in Slate's Hot Springs where they worked for the Murphy family serving visitors to the springs.

== Current use ==
The springs and resort were leased from Henry Murphy's widow Vinnie MacDonald Murphy, by her grandson, Michael Murphy, and Dick Price in 1962. They wanted to create a venue where non-traditional workshops and lecturers could present their ideas free of the dogma associated with traditional education. They incorporated their business as a non-profit named Esalen Institute in 1963.

== Bibliography ==
- Anderson, Walter Truett (2004) [1983]. The Upstart Spring: Esalen and the Human Potential Movement: The First Twenty Years. Addison Wesley Publishing Company. ISBN 0-595-30735-3.
- Kripal, Jeffrey; Shuck, Glenn W., eds. (2005). On The Edge Of The Future: Esalen And The Evolution Of American Culture. Indiana University Press. ISBN 0-253-21759-8.
