= Human potential movement =

American cultural phenomenon

The Human potential movement (HPM) arose out of the counterculture of the 1960s and formed around the concept of an extraordinary potential that its advocates believed to lie largely untapped in all people. The movement takes as its premise the belief that the development of their "human potential" can contribute to a life of increased happiness, creativity, and fulfillment, and as a result, such people will be more likely to direct their actions within society toward assisting others to release their potential. Adherents believe that the collective effect of individuals cultivating their own potential will be positive change in society at large.

== Roots ==
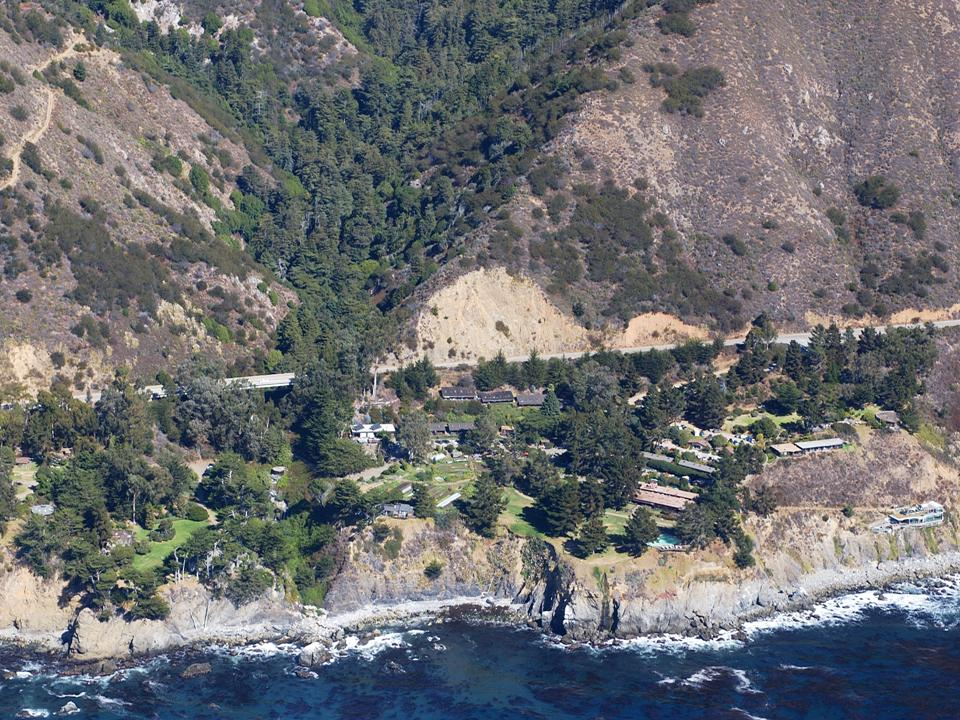
Esalen Institute

The HPM has much in common with humanistic psychology in that Abraham Maslow's theory of self-actualization strongly influenced its development. The Institutes for the Achievement of Human Potential, founded in 1955 by Glenn Doman and Carl Delacato, was an early precursor to and influence on the human potential movement, as is exemplified in Doman's assertion that "Every child born has, at the moment of birth, a greater potential intelligence than Leonardo da Vinci ever used."

In the middle of the 1960s, George Leonard did research across the United States on the subject of human potential for the magazine Look. In his research, he interviewed 37 psychiatrists, brain researchers, and philosophers about human potential. He found that "Not one of them said we were using more than 10% of our capacity", A common misconception which has since been proven false.

During the course of his research, Leonard met Michael Murphy, a co-founder of the nascent Esalen Institute (established in 1962) that, at the time, was running educational programs for adults on the topic of "human potentialities". Leonard and Murphy became close friends and together "put forth the idea that there should be a human potential movement".

== Social influence ==
HPM was regarded by some as being related to psychedelic culture such as hippies and the Summer of Love. According to author Andrew Grant Jackson, George Harrison's adoption of Hindu philosophy and Indian instrumentation in his songs with the Beatles in the mid-1960s, together with the band's highly publicised study of Transcendental Meditation, "truly kick-started" the human potential movement.

As Elizabeth Puttick writes in the Encyclopedia of New Religions:

The human potential movement (HPM) originated in the 1960s as a counter-cultural rebellion against mainstream psychology and organized religion. It is not in itself a religion, new or otherwise, but a psychological philosophy and framework, including a set of values that have made it one of the most significant and influential forces in modern Western society.

== Authors and essayists ==
Aristotle used the principles of potentiality and actuality to analyze causality, motion, biology, physiology, human psychology and ethics in his tractates on Physics, Metaphysics, Nicomachean Ethics, and De Anima.

Abraham Maslow published his concept of a hierarchy of needs in a paper in 1943. He argued that as people's basic survival needs are met, so their desire to grow in mental and emotional dimensions increases. He also coined the term "metamotivation" to describe the motivation of people who go beyond basic needs and strive for constant betterment.

Michael Murphy and Dick Price founded the Esalen Institute in 1962, primarily as a center for the study and development of human potential, and some people continue to regard Esalen as the geographical center of the movement today. They met at the suggestion of Frederic Spiegelberg, a Stanford professor of comparative religion and Indic studies, with whom both had studied.

Aldous Huxley gave lectures on the "Human Potential" at Esalen in the early 1960s. His writings and lectures on the mystical dimensions of psychedelics and on what he called "the perennial philosophy" were foundational. Moreover, his call for an institution that could teach the "nonverbal humanities" and the development of the "human potentialities" functioned as the working mission statement of early Esalen.

Christopher Lasch notes the impact of the human potential movement via the therapeutic sector: "The new therapies spawned by the human potential movement, according to Peter Marin, teach that "the individual will is all powerful and totally determines one's fate"; thus, they intensify the "isolation of the self".

George Leonard, a magazine writer and editor who conducted research for an article on human potential, became an important early influence on Esalen. Leonard claimed that he coined the phrase "human potential movement" during a brainstorming session with Michael Murphy, and popularized it in his 1972 book The Transformation: A Guide to the Inevitable Changes in Humankind. Leonard worked closely with the Esalen Institute afterwards, and in 2005 served as its president.

Martin Seligman emphasized positive psychology during his term as president of the APA beginning in 1998. Positive psychology focuses on cultivation of eudaimonia, an Ancient Greek term for "the good life" and the concept for reflection on the factors that contribute the most to a well-lived and fulfilling life, often using the terms "subjective well-being" and "happiness" interchangeably.

== In Europe ==
Maslow's hierarchy of needs, represented as a pyramid with the more basic needs at the bottom

Interest in Human Potential concepts is growing in Europe thanks to training courses aimed at managers, graduate students, and the unemployed, mainly funded by the European Union in public development courses in the 1980s and '90s. In these courses, modules such as communication skills, marketing, leadership and others in the "soft skills" area were embedded in the programs, and enabled the familiarization of most of the Human Potential concepts. A key role was played by "EU Strategic objective 3, 4, and 5" that explicitly included transversal key competences, such as learning to learn, a sense of initiative, entrepreneurship, and cultural awareness".

These training programs, lasting as much as 900 to 1,200 hours (Note: For context, 1200 hours translates to 150 days of full time training at 8 hours per day) aimed at enhancing creativity and innovation, including entrepreneurship, and contained at all levels of education and training Human Potential concepts. One of the core concepts, Maslow's hierarchy of needs, a theory of psychological health predicated on fulfilling innate human needs, became popular in Europe in the '80s mainly as a support to understanding consumer's needs, and only after its use as a key marketing concept. Philip Kotler's book "Marketing Management" was particularly influential in the '80s in popularizing several human potential concepts that were "embedded" in the book and entered in the working and management community.

Specifically targeted books on Human Potential have emerged in Europe and can be found in the works of specific authors. For the "Anglo" cultural area, the work of John Whitmore contains a harsh critique of mainstream approaches to human potential as fast cures for self-improvement: "Contrary to the appealing claims of The One Minute Manager, there are no quick fixes in business".

For the "Latin" cultural area, an early approach to Human Potential can be found in the work of Maria Montessori. Montessori's theory and philosophy of education were influenced by the psychological and pedagogical work of Jean Marc Gaspard Itard and Édouard Séguin. Her model emphasized autonomous learning, sensory exploration and training children in physical activities, empowering their senses and thoughts by exposure to sights, smells, and tactile experiences, and later included problem solving.

== Notable proponents ==
- William James (1842–1910), an early proponent
- Gerald Heard (1889–1971)
- Fritz Perls (1893–1970)
- Aldous Huxley (1894–1963)
- Carl Rogers (1902–1987)
- Moshé Feldenkrais (1904–1984)
- Viktor Frankl (1905–1997)
- Viola Spolin (1906–1994)
- Joshua L. Liebman (1907–1948)
- Abraham Maslow (1908–1970)
- Alan Watts (1915–1973)
- Harvey Jackins (1916–1999)
- Alexander Everett (1921–2005)
- Gerda Boyesen (1922–2005)
- George Leonard (1923–2010)
- William Schutz (1925–2002)
- Stan Dale (1929–2007)
- Michael Murphy (b. 1930)
- Harold C. Lyon Jr. (1935–2019)
- Werner Erhard (b. 1935)
- Jean Houston (b. 1937)
- Chungliang Al Huang (b. 1937)
- Marilyn Ferguson (1938–2008)
- Fernando Flores (b. 1943)
- Anthony Robbins (b. 1960)
- Michaela Brohm-Badry (b. 1962)
- Stanislav Grof (b. 1931)

== Notable programs ==
- Leadership Dynamics
- Silva Method
- Mind Dynamics
- Erhard Seminars Training (EST)

== See also ==
- Drug culture
- Humanistic psychology
- Personal development
- Organizations
  - Erhard Seminars Training (San Francisco-based "est.", 1971–1984) followed by "The Forum" and Landmark Worldwide (from 1991)
  - Lifespring (founded 1974 in Southern California)
- Ten-percent-of-the-brain myth
