= TarcherPerigee =

Book publisher and imprint of Penguin Group

- Parent company: Penguin Group
- Founded: 1973
- Founder: Jeremy P. Tarcher (1932–2015)
- Country of origin: United States
- Headquarters location: New York City
- Publication types: Books
- Official website: TarcherPerigee at Penguin.com

Tarcher is a book publisher and imprint of Penguin Group focused primarily on mind, body and spiritualism titles, founded in 1973 by Jeremy P. Tarcher in Los Angeles.

== History ==
Tarcher began his career in publishing in the early 1960s, putting together packaged book deals for celebrities such as Phyllis Diller, Johnny Carson, Zsa Zsa Gabor, Buddy Hackett, and Joan Rivers, but changed direction after a retreat at the Esalen Institute, an early center of the human potential movement located in Big Sur, California.

Receiving no interest from the New York publishing establishment in publishing books on these subjects, he began his own publishing venture, and went on to publish bestselling books from many previously-unknown authors working on health, psychology, philosophy, and New Age spiritutality. They include Joy's Way by W. Brugh Joy; "Drawing on the Right Side of the Brain" by Betty Edwards; Bikram's Beginning Yoga Class by hot yoga guru Bikram Choudhury; the English translation of Austrian mountaineer and Nazi SS sergeant Heinrich Harrer's Seven Years in Tibet (originally published in German in the 1940s); and The Aquarian Conspiracy by Marilyn Ferguson. He "discovered" many of these authors through his ongoing relationship with Michael Murphy, the co-founder of Esalen Institute, who also published several books with Tarcher and served on the board of Esalen for years.

Over the years, the company expanded to include nonfiction books of all types. Putnam purchased the company in 1991, and the offices were moved to New York. Tarcher remained head of the company until early 1996, when Joel Fotinos was named publisher. The firm merged with sister imprint Perigee to form TarcherPerigee in 2015.

Tarcher died in Los Angeles in 2015 from complications of Parkinson's disease. He was 83. TarcherPerigee acquired Amber-Allen Publishing, publisher of Don Miguel Ruiz' The Four Agreements, in 2024. TarcherPerigee renamed itself Tarcher in 2025.

Tarcher publications cover a broad spectrum of topics in the areas of wellness, self-improvement, spirituality, esoterica, occultism, creativity, social consciousness, prosperity, and more. Recent bestsellers include 2012: The Return of Quetzalcoatl, Ultramarathon Man, The Dumbest Generation, The Wonder of Boys, Energy Medicine, The Power of Kindness, and Think & Grow Rich.

== Authors ==
In the field of 'success literature' TarcherPerigee publishes authors such as Napoleon Hill, Michael Muhammad Knight, Wallace D. Wattles, Dale Carnegie, and James Allen. Among the imprint's authors in the field of mind, body, and spiritualism are Robin Norwood, Stephen Mansfield, Betty Edwards, Heinrich Harrer, Marilyn Ferguson (author of The Aquarian Conspiracy), Bikram Choudhury, and Jim Knipfel.
