= William A. Donius =

American author and banker

William A. Donius is an American author and former banking executive. He served as chair and chief executive officer of Pulaski Financial Corp., a St. Louis–based bank holding company, and later transitioned into writing and personal development work. He is the author of Thought Revolution, which appeared on The New York Times Best Sellers list in 2012.

== Career ==
Donius served as president and chief executive officer of Pulaski Financial Corp., the parent company of Pulaski Bank, which operated multiple branches in the St. Louis metropolitan area.

In 2008, he was appointed by the Federal Reserve Board of Governors to a two-year term on the Thrift Institutions Advisory Council, a 12-member advisory body that provides perspectives from the banking sector to the board of governors.

== Board memberships and affiliations ==
Donius is vice chair of the board of trustees of the Esalen Institute in Big Sur, California, where he has taught workshops focused on personal development for several years. He also serves on the boards of Maryville University and the Saint Louis Art Museum.

In addition, he has served on the boards of several cultural, educational, and nonprofit organizations, including Forest Park Forever, America's Community Bankers, and the Human Rights Campaign.

== Writing and personal development work ==
Following his tenure as a banking executive, Donius transitioned into writing and work focused on personal development. He is the author of Thought Revolution, first published in 2012.

In Thought Revolution, Donius outlines a reflective writing approach that he describes as "intuitive writing," a method involving responses to structured prompts intended to encourage exploratory or creative thinking. He has stated that the approach was influenced by earlier therapeutic and artistic practices, including techniques described in Recovery of Your Inner Child by therapist and author Lucia Capacchione.

== Honors and recognition ==
- Thought Revolution was listed on The New York Times Best Sellers list (2012)
- Appointed member, Federal Reserve Board Thrift Institutions Advisory Council (2008)

== Publications ==
- Thought Revolution (2012)
- Thought Revolution (2014 edition)
