= Marilyn Ferguson =

American author, editor, and public speaker

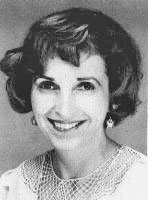
- Ferguson, c. 1980
- Born: April 5, 1938; Grand Junction, Colorado, United States
- Died: October 19, 2008 (aged 70)
- Occupations: author, editor, public speaker
- Writing career
- Notable work: The Aquarian Conspiracy
- Movement: New Age

Marilyn Ferguson (April 5, 1938 – October 19, 2008) was an American author, editor and public speaker known for her 1980 book The Aquarian Conspiracy, which is connected with the New Age Movement.

Ferguson published and edited the well-regarded science newsletter Brain/Mind Bulletin from 1975 to 1996. She eventually earned several honorary degrees, served on the board of directors of the Institute of Noetic Sciences, and befriended such diverse figures of influence as inventor and theorist Buckminster Fuller, spiritual author Ram Dass, Nobel Prize-winning chemist Ilya Prigogine and billionaire Ted Turner. Ferguson's work also influenced Vice President Al Gore, who participated in her informal network while a senator, and later met with her in the White House.

== Youth and early writing career ==
Ferguson was born Marilyn Louise Grasso in Grand Junction, Colorado. After graduation from high school she earned an associate of arts degree at Mesa College (now Colorado Mesa University) and later attended the University of Colorado. During her first marriage, to Don Renzelman, she worked as a legal secretary and became a published author of short stories and poetry in such national magazines as Cosmopolitan. Later she wrote freelance articles for Time and other publications. After living briefly in Houston, Texas, she moved to California with her second husband, Mike Ferguson, in 1968. That year, she published her first book, on home economics, with her husband as co-author.

== The Brain Revolution and Brain/Mind Bulletin ==
Ferguson soon developed an enduring interest in what came to be known as the "human potential" movement, and particularly the latest research on the potential of the human brain, with its implications for learning, creativity and wellness.

This inspired her to write The Brain Revolution: The Frontiers of Mind Research (Taplinger, 1973), a successful and broadly hailed popular summary of these discoveries. Two years later Ferguson launched Brain/Mind Bulletin, a newsletter that served as an ongoing forum for her interest in cutting-edge scientific ideas. At its peak in the 1980s the publication had a worldwide base of some 10,000 subscribers, ranging from academics and intellectuals to schoolteachers and storekeepers, and helped to popularize the ideas of such notables as Prigogine, neuroscientists Karl Pribram and Candace Pert, physicists Fritjof Capra and David Bohm, psychologist Jean Houston and many others.

The magazine sold ad space to New Age advertisers.

== The Aquarian Conspiracy ==
The Aquarian Conspiracy
- book cover
- Author: Marilyn Ferguson
- Cover artist: John Brogna
- Publisher: Jeremy P. Tarcher
- Publication date: 1980
- ISBN: 0-87477-191-9
- OCLC: 299846396

=== New Age positivism ===
In an early commentary in the newsletter Ferguson described her first glimmers of what she called "the movement that has no name" - a loose, enthusiastic network of innovators from almost every discipline, united by their apparent desire to create real and lasting change in society and its institutions. Her attempt to compile and synthesize the patterns she was seeing eventually led her to develop a second newsletter, Leading Edge Bulletin, and found its culmination in The Aquarian Conspiracy (J.P. Tarcher, 1980), the seminal work that earned her a lasting global reputation.

The book's title led to some confusion, having to do with astrology only to the extent of drawing from the popular conception of the "Age of Aquarius" succeeding a dark "Piscean" age. The word conspiracy she used in its literal sense of "breathing together," as one of her great influences, the philosopher Pierre Teilhard de Chardin, had done before her.

Unabashedly positive in its outlook, the book was praised by such diverse figures as philosophical writer Arthur Koestler, who called it "stunning and provocative," commentator Max Lerner, who found it "drenched in sunlight," and United Nations Assistant Secretary-General Robert Muller, who described it as "remarkable" and "epoch-making." Psychologist Carl Rogers credited her with having "etched, in unforgettable vividness, the intricate web of changes shaping the inevitable revolution in our culture," and said the book "gives the pioneering spirit the courage to go forward."

In the New Age Encyclopedia, J. Gordon Melton called this book "the most commonly accepted statement of Movement ideals and goals". Philosopher and religious scholar Jacob Needleman predicted that the book would help to make "New Age" thinking "more understandable and less threatening" to the general public in America. This was borne out by its success, as The Aquarian Conspiracy steadily climbed to the best-seller list and its viewpoint began seeping into the popular culture. Before long the book was being credited as "the handbook of the New Age" (USA Today) and a guidepost to a philosophy "working its way increasingly into the nation's cultural, religious, social, economic and political life" (New York Times).

Although the book was not explicitly political, it expressed early enthusiasm for the radical centrist perspective. In the "Right Power" chapter Ferguson writes, "Radical Center ... is not neutral, not middle-of-the-road, but a view of the whole road. From this vantage point, we can see that the various schools of thought on any one issue – political or otherwise – include valuable contributions along with error and exaggeration."

The book was eventually translated into some 16 foreign languages, and Ferguson became a sought-after speaker across North America and around the world, eventually traveling as far as Brazil, Sweden and India to convey her hopeful message. In 1985 she was featured as a keynote speaker at the United Nations-sponsored "Spirit of Peace" conference, where she appeared along with Mother Teresa and the Dalai Lama of Tibet.

=== Religious and other criticism ===
Such validation did not come without a price. Ferguson was attacked in some quarters for excessive optimism. Others alleged that her "new" ideas were merely a repackaging of old notions of positive thinking, and some saw the "New Age" (a term Ferguson herself seldom used) as merely extending the self-absorption that had marked much of the 1970s. Most persistently, some religious groups contended that the "conspiracy" was an attempt to subvert Christian views. This view, most notably expressed by author Constance Cumbey in her 1983 book The Hidden Dangers of the Rainbow, was restated as recently as 2007, when one online essayist wrote that the Christian church "rightly discerned the New Age movement, as outlined in Ferguson’s book, to be demonically inspired in anticipation of the ultimate unveiling of . . . the antichrist." It was inaccurately alleged that Ferguson, herself raised and confirmed a Lutheran, had written the book at the behest of the Stanford Research Institute with the goal of overtaking western culture with Eastern mysticism.

=== Impact and reissue ===
Indirectly supporting both Ferguson and her critics, the New Age movement, as popularly understood, did thrive in the 1980s and into the 1990s, though this was partially through such pop-cultural manifestations as the autobiographical works of actress Shirley MacLaine and the "Harmonic Convergence" festival of 1987. While the period was marked by undeniable evolution in the fields of politics, education and medicine, many other ideas and practices were transitory. Through it all Ferguson remained an optimist, albeit one who did not ignore the depth of society's chronic problems. Commenting in advance of the 1988 presidential election, she noted that "there is no panacea for our social maladies" – but there remained the power of belief. "Our ‘foolish illusion’ that we can effect change fosters in us the capacity to act – and therefore to bring about change." ("The Great Depression . . . The Great Schizophrenia," Brain/Mind Bulletin, October 1988.)

In 1987 The Aquarian Conspiracy was reissued, featuring a new introduction by another of her allies, futurist-author John Naisbitt (Megatrends). While slowly developing a follow-up work, Ferguson returned her primary focus to reporting on scientific research in Brain-Mind Bulletin. There she continued to explore the links between body and mind and new theoretical models in neuroscience, physics, psychology, education and health until the newsletter ceased publication in 1996.

=== Aquarius Now ===
The long-planned Aquarius Now, after near-publication in several previous forms, appeared in 2005. The book, published by Red Wheel/Weiser, was well-received, though less commercially successful. Following its release Ferguson continued to develop projects, share ideas and advise other authors. In 2007 she moved to Banning, California, near her son and his family.

== Death and reaction ==
Ferguson died unexpectedly of an apparent heart attack on October 19, 2008. The Los Angeles Times described her as a "galvanizing influence," and quoted her U.S. publisher, Jeremy P. Tarcher, who described his own personal epiphany when he first met with Ferguson and recognized the potential of the information she had collected. The New York Times called The Aquarian Conspiracy "the Bible of the New Age," and mused that the once-radical ideas of her "benign conspiracy" may now seem commonplace.

Offering a tribute on the website beliefnet.com (also on The Huffington Post's website), author Deepak Chopra described Ferguson as "a one-woman movement for hope." He recalled being a young doctor who was studying meditation when he came across The Aquarian Conspiracy in the early 1980s, and realized the book had instantly unified a movement that otherwise seemed to be resigned to the fringes. At her death, Chopra wrote, Ferguson could rest in the knowledge that "a watershed had been crossed," and that her "leaderless revolution" had steadily gained force around the world in the generation since the book was written.

The Aquarian Conspiracy was re-issued in a "Tarcher Cornerstone" edition in August 2009, featuring a new introduction by Jeremy Tarcher. In October 2009, Ferguson received a posthumous Distinguished Alumna award from Mesa State College.

== Personal life ==
She and her second husband Mike Ferguson had three children: Eric Ferguson (born 1964), Kristin Ferguson Smith (born 1967) and Lynn Ferguson Lewis (born 1969). She and Mike Ferguson divorced in 1978, but she retained his last name (which is also the family name of her children). Ferguson subsequently married Ray Gottlieb from 1983 to 1991.

== Books ==
- The Brain Revolution: The Frontiers of Mind Research (Taplinger Publishing, 1973) ISBN 0-8008-0961-0, ISBN 978-0-8008-0961-4, ISBN 978-0-8008-0961-4, ISBN 0-8008-0961-0
- The Aquarian Conspiracy: Personal and Social Transformation in Our Time (Jeremy P. Tarcher, 1980; 1987) ISBN 0-312-90418-5, ISBN 978-0-312-90418-0, ISBN 978-0-312-90418-0, ISBN 0-312-90418-5, ISBN 0-87477-116-1, ISBN 978-0-87477-116-9, ISBN 978-0-87477-116-9 ISBN 0-87477-116-1
- PragMagic: Ten Years of Scientific Breakthroughs, Exciting Ideas, and Personal Experiments That Can Profoundly Change Your Life (Pocket Books, 1990) ISBN 0-671-66824-2, ISBN 978-0-671-66824-2, ISBN 978-0-671-66824-2, ISBN 0-671-66824-2
- Aquarius Now: Radical Common Sense and Reclaiming Our Personal Sovereignty (Red Wheel/Weiser, 2005) ISBN 1-57863-369-9
