= Chani Nicholas =

Canadian astrologer (born 1975)

- Born: British Columbia, Canada
- Occupation: Astrologer
- Years active: 2011–present
- Notable work: You Were Born For This: Astrology for Radical Acceptance (2020)
- Spouse: Sonya Passi

Chani Nicholas (/ˈtʃæni/ CHAN-ee; born 1975) is a Canadian astrologer and activist.

== Early life and education ==
Nicholas was born and raised in rural British Columbia, Canada. At age 13, she received training in Reiki.

By age 29, she moved to Los Angeles in 2004 to pursue acting. After deciding to leave the industry, she enrolled at the California Institute of Integral Studies where she completed her bachelor's degree. During this time, she began to study feminists such as bell hooks and grew her interest in social justice.

== Career ==
Nicholas began her career by writing a weekly astrology newsletter to friends and family in 2011. Her work focuses on progressive values and marginalized communities, such as queer and trans people. Nicholas appeared on the fourteenth episode of the Netflix series Explained, "Astrology" in 2018, and she was the "resident astrologer" on Oprah Magazine's website.

Her first book, You Were Born For This: Astrology for Radical Acceptance was released by HarperCollins on January 7, 2020. In an interview with KCRW, Nicholas stated that she hoped to "write a book that would help people access the wisdom of their chart so that they could more quickly align with living out their purpose. And so that we could all be, again, more quickly of service to the world." The book debuted at #8 on the New York Times Best Seller list.

In December 2020, Nicholas launched an app called CHANI where users can receive astrology information.

== Awards and recognition ==
In 2018, Nicholas was honored by the Astraea Foundation in Los Angeles for the impact her work has had on inspiring and nourishing queer and intersectional feminist spaces. She was also honored by the San Francisco Yerba Buena Center for the Arts YBCA 100 Summit in 2018.

== Personal life ==
Nicholas is married to Sonya Passi, the founder of Freefrom, a national organization working to financially empower survivors of domestic violence. They reside in Los Angeles.

In early 2023, Nicholas and Sonya Passi had their first child.

== Works ==
- You Were Born For This: Astrology for Radical Acceptance (2020), HarperCollins; ISBN 9780062840653
