= Frederic Spiegelberg =

German professor of Asian religion (1897-1994)

Frederic Spiegelberg (May 24, 1897 – November 10, 1994) was a Stanford University professor of Asian religions.

== Education and career ==
Spiegelberg was born in Hamburg, Germany, in 1897 and earned his doctorate at the University of Tübingen in 1922. He went on to earn a theological degree from the German Lutheran Church. He studied with theologians Rudolf Otto and Paul Tillich, the philosopher Martin Heidegger, and the psychologist Carl Jung. He participated in Jung's Eranos symposia and lectured at Jung's institute in Zurich. In 1933, Spiegelberg took over Tillich's position at the University of Dresden, but only four years later he was fired from his position and he and his wife, Rosalie, fled Hitler's Germany with the aid of Tillich.

In the United States, Spiegelberg taught at Columbia University, the University of Rochester, the University of California, Union Theological Seminary and the Pacific School of Religion. He joined Stanford as a lecturer in religion in 1941 and retired in 1962 as professor of Indian civilization in the Department of Asiatic and Slavic Studies. He became an expert in Asian religions with a classical comparative focus. He was known for his command of languages, including Sanskrit, Pali, Hebrew, Greek, Latin, German and French. He was considered an exceptional lecturer, winning student awards and the admiration of peers.

In 1950, Spiegelberg invited Indian professor of philosophy Haridas Chaudhuri, who had done his dissertation on the Integral philosophy of Sri Aurobindo, to join the staff of the newly formed American Academy of Asian Studies in San Francisco, the first accredited U.S. graduate school devoted exclusively to the study of Asiatic lands and peoples. This school was closed and replaced in 1968 by the California Institute of Asian (now Integral) Studies founded by Haridas Chaudhuri where Spiegelberg served as president from 1976 to 1978. In 1960, Spiegelberg and Chaudhuri published a commemorative volume on Sri Aurobindo.

Spiegelberg was also involved in founding the Esalen Institute with former student Michael Murphy and Dick Price.

In 2007, religion scholar Jeffrey Kripal summarized Spiegelberg's approach to religion as follows:

Spiegelberg’s phrase "the religion of no religion" had deep existential roots. It was based on a mystical encounter with the natural world he experienced as a young theology student. He was walking in a wheat field on a bright day when, quite suddenly, his ego vanished and what he calls the Self appeared. Through this altered perspective, he began to see that God was shining through everything in the world, that everything was divine, that there was nothing but holiness. As he reveled in this revelation, he came around a corner and found himself confronting a gray church. He was horrified. How, he asked himself, could such a building claim to hold something more sacred, more divine, than what he had just experienced in the poppies, birds, and sky of the now divinized cosmos? It all seemed preposterous, utterly preposterous, to him. From the theological scandal of this initial altered state, Spiegelberg developed and theorized what was essentially (or non-essentially) an apophatic mystical theology that approaches religious language, symbol, and myth as non-literal projective expressions of some deeper metaphysical truth that, paradoxically, is simultaneously immanent and transcendent—a kind of dialectical or mystical humanism, if you will. It was just such a comparative mystical theology grounded in the natural world, and just such a critical but deep engagement with the religious traditions of the world, that inspired Murphy and his colleagues in their new venture.

Spiegelberg died in 1994 of complications from abdominal surgery. He was survived by a daughter, Corinne Wilkinson, as well as two children from an earlier marriage: a son, Valentin Spiegelberg, and a daughter, Dorothea Florian.

== Publications ==
- Spiritual Practices of India. Citadel Press, 1962.
- Zen, Rocks, and Waters. Pantheon Books, 1961.
- Living Religions of the World. Prentice-Hall, 1956.
- The Religion of No-Religion. J. L. Delkin, 1948.
- Alchemy as a Way of Salvation. J. L. Delkin, 1945.
