= David Price (actor) =

American actor

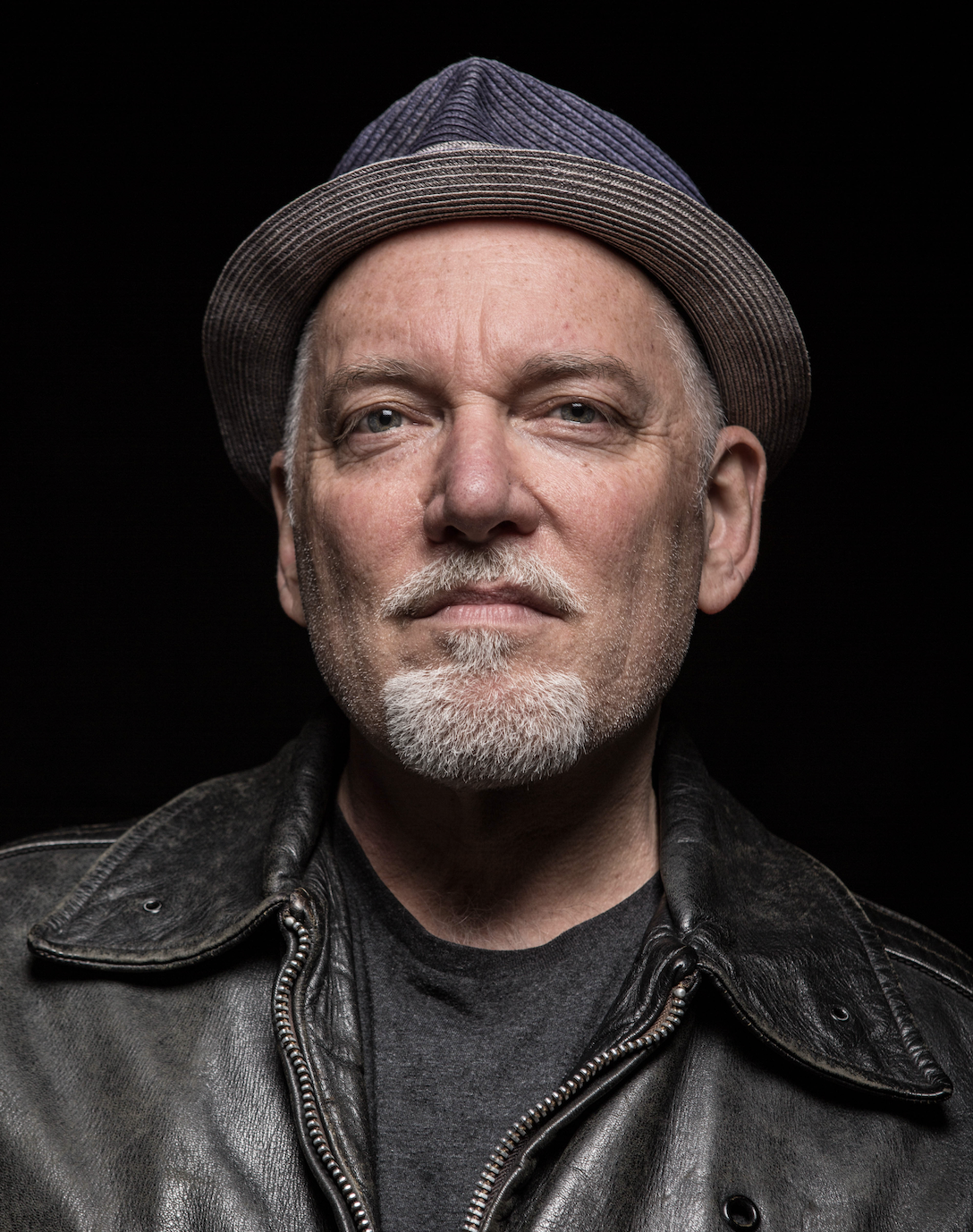
- Occupations: Actor, musician
- Years active: 1980s–present
- Father: Dick Price

David Price (born 1963) is an American film and television actor and musician who lives and works in Poland.

== Film ==
In one of the few speaking roles in a nearly dialog-free film, Price played opposite Vincent Gallo's character in Jerzy Skolimowski's multi-award-winning movie Essential Killing.

== Television ==
Price has played in Polish and German television serials and productions.

== Filmography ==
=== Actor ===
- Teraz Albo Nigdy (2008) television serial – Poland
- Londyńczycy (2009) television serial – Poland
- Sprawedliwi (2010) television serial – Poland
- Essential Killing (2010) feature film – Poland/Norway/Ireland/Hungary
- Misja: Afganistan (2012) television serial – Poland
- Bogowie (2014) feature film – Poland
- 11 Minutes (2015) feature film – Poland/Ireland
- 1983 (2018) Netflix series – Poland
- The Liberator (2020) Netflix miniseries
- Brigitte Bardot Forever (Brigitte Bardot Cudowna) (2021) feature film – Poland
- Eagle (2024) feature film - India
- Fatherland (2026) feature film - Poland/Germany

== Music ==
Price is a double bass and electric bass guitar player whose most notable work has been as a member of Babatunde Olatunji's band, "Drums of Passion", from 1989 until Olatunji's death in 2003.

== Discography ==
=== Albums ===
- Mississippi to Monterey – (1999), John "Broadway" Tucker, released on Messaround Records
- Impromptu Blue – (2000), John "Broadway" Tucker, released on Blue Movie Records
- Come Together - Live – (2005), John "Broadway" Tucker, Leszek Cichoński & Wojciech Karolak, released on Omertà Records
- Best of - Studio & Live – (2009), Leszek Cichoński, released on Midi-Max Records
