= Stan Dale =

Stan Dale (1929 in New York City – June 8, 2007) was a radio broadcaster, writer, teacher, and founder of the Human Awareness Institute in 1968. He was the author of books in the area of relationships and sexuality, including Fantasies Can Set You Free (Celestial Arts, 1980) and My Child My Self: How to Raise the Child You Always Wanted to Be. Dale was trained as a Transactional Analyst. He hosted the first ever psychological-based call-in talk radio show, in Chicago, and hosted radio shows on San Francisco Bay Area radio stations KGO, KSFO and K101. He held degrees in psychology and sociology from Roosevelt University, Chicago the Illinois Institute of Applied Psychology, and a degree in sexuality from The Institute for the Advanced Study of Human Sexuality in San Francisco, where he was adjunct professor of behavioral studies in human sexuality.

Dale was on the faculties of Loyola University, Mundelein College in Chicago, and Sonoma State University. He was a visiting professor at Shandong and Beijing Universities.

Early in his radio career, Dale also did voice work for radio, voicing characters on numerous shows, including briefly the voice of The Shadow.
