= Golf in the Kingdom =

Novel by Michael Murphy

- Cover of the 1974 UK first edition
- Author: Michael Murphy
- Language: English
- Subject: Golf; Mysticism
- Publisher: Penguin Books
- Publication date: October 1, 1971
- Publication place: United States
- Media type: Print
- Pages: 240
- ISBN: 0-14-019549-1
- Followed by: Jacob Atabet

Golf in the Kingdom is a 1971 novel by Michael Murphy. It has sold over a million copies and been translated into 19 languages. Golf in the Kingdom tells the story of Michael Murphy, a young traveler who accidentally stumbles on a mystical golfing expert while in Scotland.

Murphy was inspired to write the book after his time at the Sri Aurobindo Ashram. He became interested in the similarities between descriptions of successful athletes and people who said they had achieved the state of Zen. The novel spawned the Shivas Irons Society, an organization whose members combine golf and meditation. In 1997, Murphy wrote a sequel, The Kingdom of Shivas Irons.

== Plot ==
While on layover on his way to an ashram in India, Michael Murphy decides to play a round of golf at Burningbush, a famous local golf course. There he meets the mysterious and charismatic golf pro Shivas Irons who over a 24-hour period teaches him about golf and spirituality.

== Film version ==
Clint Eastwood purchased the rights to the book, but abandoned the project after writing several unfinished scripts in the early 1990s.

In 2009, Murphy, producer Mindy Affrime and director Susan Streitfeld began filming their version of the book. Shot on location at Bandon Dunes Golf Resort, it stars David O'Hara and Mason Gamble and premiered in New York City on July 29, 2011. Review aggregator Metacritic rates the film version 13 out of 100, indicating "overwhelming dislike", with all five critic reviews being negative.

Golf in the Kingdom is referenced in the fifth episode of season one of the television series Franklin & Bash.

== See also ==
- The Legend of Bagger Vance
