= Haridas Chaudhuri =

Indian integral philosopher (1913-1975)

Bust of Chaudhuri by Jan-Michelle Sawyer

Haridas Chaudhuri (May 1913 – 1975) was an Indian integral philosopher. He was a correspondent with Sri Aurobindo and the founder of the California Institute of Integral Studies (CIIS).

== Early life and education ==
He was born in May 1913 in Shyamagram in East Bengal (now Bangladesh). He studied at the Scottish Church College and later at the University of Calcutta from where he earned his doctorate in Indian philosophy. He became a professor and later the chair of philosophy at the Krishnagar College, then a constituent college of the University of Calcutta.

== Career ==
=== California Institute of Integral Studies ===
In 1951, Chaudhuri was invited by Frederic Spiegelberg of Stanford University to join the staff of the newly formed American Academy of Asian Studies in San Francisco, having been recommended for that post by Sri Aurobindo during the final year of Aurobindo's life. Other accounts have indicated that Chaudhuri was recommended for the job by K.D. Sethna, an eminent intellectual living at Aurobindo's ashram, based in part on the fact that Chaudhuri was an active devotee of Sri Aurobindo. He accepted the invitation, eager to implement in a Western educational institution the integral approach to education that he had developed as a student of Sri Aurobindo.

Soon after his arrival in San Francisco, Chaudhuri and his wife Bina established the Cultural Integration Fellowship (CIF), from which emerged an educational branch later to become California Institute of Integral Studies. Over the past 30 years, the institute's original emphasis on Asian religions and cultures evolved to include comparative and cross-cultural studies in philosophy, religion, psychology, counseling, cultural anthropology, organizational studies, health studies, and the arts.

In 1987 the Institute established the Chaudhuri Chair in the name of Haridas Chaudhuri. In 2016 this became "The Haridas Chaudhuri Endowed Chair in Indian Philosophy and Culture" and Dr. Debashish Banerji was appointed as the chair holder.

=== Integral psychology ===
Chaudhuri was the first to publish in the West on integral psychology, during the 1970s. His version of integral psychology has almost nothing in common with that of Ken Wilber, who has written a book of the same name.

Bahman Shirazi of the California Institute of Integral Studies has defined integral psychology as "a psychological system concerned with exploring and understanding the totality of the human phenomenon....(which) at its breadth, covers the entire body-mind-psyche-spirit spectrum, while at its depth...encompasses the previously explored unconscious and the conscious dimensions of the psyche, as well as the supra-conscious dimension traditionally excluded from psychological inquiry". (Shirazi 2001) In a paper on the subject he reviews Indra Sen's, Chaudhuri's, and Wilber's definitions, as well as developing the ideas of Chaudhuri.

== Bibliography ==
- "Haridas Chaudhury" in Jones, Constance A.; Ryan, James D. (2007). Encyclopedia of Hinduism. New York: Facts on File. pp. 105–106. ISBN 9780816075645. OCLC 191044722.
- "Haridas Chaudhury" in: Melton, J. Gordon (1999). Religious leaders of America : a biographical guide to founders and leaders of religious bodies, churches, and spiritual groups in North America (2d ed.). Detroit, MI: Gale Research. p. 238. ISBN 9780810388789. OCLC 41000889.
- The Philosophy of Integralism or The Metaphysical Synthesis Inherent in the Teaching of Sri Aurobindo, Sri Aurobindo Pathamandir, Calcutta, 1954, 366 p.
- Prayers of Affirmation: a guide to daily meditation, 1956
- The Rhythm of Truth, Cultural Integration Fellowship, 1958
- Integral Yoga: The Concept of Harmonious and Creative Living Wheaton, Illinois: The Theosophical Publishing House, 1965
- Philosophy of Meditation, 1965
- Mastering the problems of living, 1968
- "Psychology: Humanistic and transpersonal". Journal of Humanistic Psychology, 15 (1), 7–15, 1975
- The Evolution of Integral Consciousness, 1977. Wheaton, Illinois: Quest Books. 1989 paperback reprint: ISBN 0-8356-0494-2
- Modern man's religion, 1984. ISBN 0-916985-00-8
- Being, Evolution and Immortality, 1988. ISBN 0-8356-0449-7
- The Philosophy of Love, 1988. ISBN 0-14-019117-8
- Evolution of Integral Consciousness, 1989. ISBN 0-8356-0494-2
- The Essence of Spiritual Philosophy, 1990. ISBN 1-85274-074-4
- Sri Aurobindo: The Prophet of Life Divine
- Indian Culture
- (with Frederic Spiegelberg) The integral philosophy of Sri Aurobindo: a commemorative symposium, Allen & Unwin, 1960
