= Michael Murphy (author) =

American writer and co-founder of Esalen

Michael Murphy (born September 3, 1930) is an American writer, co-founder of the Esalen Institute, and a key figure in the Human Potential Movement.

== Life and career ==
Michael Murphy was born September 3, 1930, to an Irish father and Basque mother in Salinas, California.

In April 1950, while enrolled in the pre-med program at Stanford University, he mistakenly wandered into a lecture on comparative religions. This lecture so fanned the flame of his interest in the integration of Eastern and Western thought that he enrolled in the class and subsequently began meditation.

On January 15, 1951, during seated meditation by Lake Lagunita at Stanford, he experienced what he describes as a "hinge moment", after which he dropped out of the pre-med program with a new vision for the purpose of his life.

He continued with his formal education, earning his B.A. in psychology in 1952 from Stanford University. After graduation, he was drafted by the US Army and spent two years stationed in Puerto Rico as a psychologist. He returned to Stanford for two quarters of graduate studies in philosophy before he quit in 1956 to go to India.

=== India ===
During 1956 and 1957 Murphy practiced meditation for 18 months at the Sri Aurobindo Ashram in Pondicherry, India.

=== Founding Esalen ===
In 1960, while in residence at the Sri Aurobindo Ashram Cultural Integration Fellowship in San Francisco, he met a fellow Stanford University graduate, Dick Price. In 1962, they founded Esalen Institute together in Big Sur, California on 127 acres (0.51 km^{2}) of property owned by Murphy's family.

In 1972 he retired from actively running Esalen to do more writing. He remains on the board at the institute and continues to be a key contributor to research projects at the Esalen Center for Theory and Research. He presently resides in Mill Valley, California.

=== Further contributions ===
In the 1980s he organized Esalen's Soviet-American Exchange Program which served as a unique form of citizen-to-citizen diplomacy. The program initiated the process that led to Boris Yeltsin's first visit to the US 1990.

In 1992 he published The Future of the Body, a massive historical and cross-cultural collection of documentation of various occurrences of extraordinary human functioning such as healing, hypnosis, martial arts, yogic techniques, telepathy, clairvoyance, and feats of superhuman strength. Rather than presenting such documentation as scientific proof, he presents it as a body of evidence to motivate further investigation.

He is also an avid golfer and has written two fictional books relating golf and human potential. His 1971 novel, Golf in the Kingdom, has been in constant publication since its release and has become one of the best selling golf books of all time. In 1992 it spawned The Shivas Irons Society, a 501(c)3 organization to explore the transformational potential of sport, of which Murphy is the co-chairman of the advisory board. He partnered with film producer Mindy Affrime on the feature film adaptation of Golf In The Kingdom. It was directed by Susan Streitfeld and stars David O'Hara, Mason Gamble, Malcolm McDowell and Frances Fisher. The complementary one-hour TV documentary, called Golfers in the Kingdom, was directed by Ellen Spiro.

== Works ==
- Golf in the Kingdom (fiction) (1971)
- Jacob Atabet (fiction) (Jeremy P. Tarcher/St. Martin's Press, 1977)
- The Psychic Side of Sports (non-fiction, co-written with Rhea White) (1978)
- An End to Ordinary History: A Novel (fiction) (1982)
- The Future of the Body: Explorations into the Further Evolution of Human Nature (1992)
- The Life We Are Given: A Long-Term Program for Realizing the Potential of Body, Mind, Heart, and Soul (non-fiction, co-written with George Leonard) (1995)
- In the Zone: Transcendent Experience in Sports (non-fiction, update to The Psychic Side of Sports, co-written with Rhea White) (1995)
- The Physical and Psychological Effects of Meditation: A Review of Contemporary Research With a Comprehensive Bibliography, 1931-1996 (non-fiction, 2nd edition) (1997)
- The Kingdom of Shivas Irons (fiction - sequel to Golf in the Kingdom) (1997)
- God and the Evolving Universe: The Next Step in Personal Evolution (non-fiction, co-written with James Redfield and Sylvia Timbers) (2002)
- An End to Ordinary History: Comments on a Philosophical Novel (non-fiction) (2011)
