= George Leonard =

American writer and educator (1923–2010)

George Burr Leonard
- Born: August 9, 1923; Macon, Georgia, U.S.
- Died: January 6, 2010 (aged 86); Mill Valley, California, U.S.
- Education: University of North Carolina
- Occupations: teacher, writer
- Years active: 1953–2010
- Known for: Human Potential Movement, Integral Transformative Practice, Aikido
- Spouse: Annie Styron Leonard

George Burr Leonard (August 9, 1923 – January 6, 2010) was an American writer, editor, and educator who wrote extensively about education and human potential. He served as President Emeritus of the Esalen Institute, past-president of the Association for Humanistic Psychology, co-founder of Integral Transformative Practice International, and a writer and editor at Look Magazine (1953 - 1970). He was a United States Army Air Corps pilot, and held a fifth-degree black belt in aikido. Typical of his philosophy, life's work, and the times (1960s), Leonard stated: "Western civilization has been a 2,000 year long exercise in robbing people of the present. People are now learning the powerful joys that hide in the narrow place of the hourglass, the eternal moment. Here is their golden learning: to see - really see - spring flowers; to feel - really feel - the grace of love."

Leonard co-founded the Aikido of Tamalpais dojo, originally in Mill Valley, later in Corte Madera, California. He also developed the Leonard Energy Training (LET) practice for centering mind, body, and spirit. Leonard died at his home in Mill Valley, California on January 6, 2010, after a long illness. He was 86 years old.

== Early life ==
Born in Macon, Ga. with a grandfather who was a State senator who owned black tenant farms, he witnessed the attempted mob lynching of a black rape suspect. After service as a combat pilot in World War II and the Korean War, he then joined the staff of Look in 1953 and was soon reporting on the civil rights movement.

== Books ==
- The Decline of the American Male (1958) ASIN B000JWGFBW
- Shoulder the Sky (1959) ASIN B000HLSI5Q
- Education and Ecstasy (1968) ISBN 978-1-55643-005-3
  - with "The great school reform hoax" (1987) ISBN 1-55643-005-1
- The Man & Woman Thing, and Other Provocations (1970) ASIN B0006DY0R0
- The Transformation: a guide to the inevitable changes in humankind (1972) ISBN 978-0-87477-169-5
- The Silent Pulse: a search for the perfect rhythm that exists in each of us (1978, 1986) ISBN 978-1-4236-0122-7
- The End of Sex (1983) ISBN 978-0-09-152830-0
- Walking on the Edge of the World (1988) ISBN 978-0-395-48311-4
- Mastery: The Keys to Success and Long-Term Fulfillment (1992) ISBN 978-0-452-26756-5
- The Life We Are Given (1995) ISBN 978-0-87477-853-3
- The Way of Aikido: Life Lessons from an American Sensei (2000) ISBN 978-0-452-27972-8
- The Ultimate Athlete (1977, 2001) ISBN 978-1-55643-349-8
