= List of people in alternative medicine =

This is a list of people in alternative medicine who are notable for developing, founding, inventing, promoting, practicing, marketing, commentating or researching on alternative medicine.

== A ==
- Albert Abrams – inventor of Electronic Reactions of Abrams "technology", dynomizer, oscilloclast and radioclast.
- F. Matthias Alexander – founder of the Alexander Technique, a movement retraining process.
- C. A. Ansar – Indian alternative medical practitioner
- Guillermo Arévalo Valera – Shipibo writer, vegetalista, and exponent of Amazonian traditional medicine

== B ==
- Edward Bach – Founder of flower essence therapy and the Bach flower remedies.
- William Horatio Bates – Founder of the Bates method alternative approach to eyesight improvement.
- Henry G. Bieler – American physician and author of Food is Your Best Medicine, known for diet-based healing and treatment of Hollywood celebrities.
- Ty Bollinger - Co-founder of The Truth About Cancer, promoter of ineffective cancer cures.
- Paul Bragg – Known for the Bragg Health Crusades, the Bragg Healthy Lifestyle, deep breathing, water fasts, organic foods, juicing and listening to one's body.

== C ==
- Charaka – One of the founders of Ayurveda.
- Deepak Chopra – Endocrinologist and Ayurvedic Medicine Practitioner, author of popular books on health and spirituality.
- Nicholas Culpeper – English physician, author of the early seventeenth century Culpeper's Herbal.

== E ==
- Mary Baker Eddy – Founder of Christian Science, which advocates Christian healing.

== F ==
- Moshé Feldenkrais – Inventor of the Feldenkrais method.

== G ==
- Irene Gauthier – One of the founders of the field of Myomassology.
- Sylvester Graham – Known for Graham Crackers and founded Grahamism.
- Stanislav Grof – One of the founders of the field of transpersonal psychology and founder of Holotropic Breathwork.

== H ==
- Samuel Hahnemann – Founded homeopathy.
- Michael Harner – Synthesized shamanic beliefs and practices from all over the world into a system now known as neoshamanism.
- Gustav Hemwall – Prolotherapy injection proponent.

== J ==
- Stan Jones – Promoter of colloidal silver, which has permanently turned his skin a blue-gray color.
- Adolf Just – Late 19th/Early 20th century German naturopath. Advocate for the "Nature Cure" movement.

== K ==
- John Harvey Kellogg – Promoter of colon therapy at the Battle Creek Sanatorium in Battle Creek, Michigan.
- Will Keith Kellogg – Inventor of corn flakes in 1894 and manager of the Battle Creek Sanitarium.
- Sebastian Kneipp – Bavarian priest who began the Nature Cure movement (1890s). Chiefly known for his contributions to hydrotherapy.
- Louis Kuhne – Promoter of hydrotherapy, especially hip and sitz baths.

== L ==
- George Lewith – UK advocate for alternative medicine and professor at Southampton University.
- Pehr Henrik Ling – Swedish pioneer of physical education. Falsely credited as the Father of Swedish Massage (that credit goes to Johann Georg Mezger).
- Benedict Lust – Founder of naturopathic medicine in the United States. Purchased the rights to the term "naturopathy" from John Scheel.

== M ==
- Maria Sabina – Mexican healer, mystic leader of Mazatec people, curandero specializing in the native psilocybe mushrooms.
- Caroline Myss – American medical intuitive, mystic and author.

== N ==
- Devi Nambudripad – Founder of NAET, controversial allergy treatment.

== O ==
- Leonard Orr – Developed Rebirthing.
- David Orme-Johnson – Researcher and proponent of Transcendental Meditation technique.

== P ==
- Daniel Palmer – Founder of chiropractic.
- B. J. Palmer – Son of D.D. Palmer and known as the "developer" of chiropractic.
- Linus Pauling – Coined the term "orthomolecular medicine," the controversial use of Vitamin C and other megavitamin therapies. Pauling was however not a general supporter of alternative medicine.
- Fritz Perls – Founder of Gestalt Therapy.
- Vincent Priessnitz – One of the founders of hydrotherapy.

== R ==
- Wilhelm Reich – Founder of Orgonomy.
- Ida P. Rolf – Founder of Rolfing Structural Integration, the first bodywork that attempted to change posture.

== S ==
- Charlotte Selver – Introduced the concept of sensory awareness for movement education and healing, which influenced many health disciplines during the Human Potential Movement.
- Herbert Shelton – Founded the Natural Hygiene movement.
- Bernie Siegel – American MD and author who promotes cultivating one's attitude toward healing.
- Rudolf Steiner – Founded anthroposophical medicine.
- David Stephan - Speaker at health and wellness expos where he promotes Truehope Nutritional Support supplements.
- Andrew Taylor Still – Founded osteopathy, a manual therapy practice.

== T ==
- Samuel Thomson – 19th century herbalist, founded Thomsonian Medicine.
- Mabel Todd – Founded Ideokinesis, a form of somatic education, in the 1930s.
- Mohammad Ali Taheri – founder of two complementary medicines Faradarmani and Psymentology.

== U ==
- Mikao Usui – Founded Reiki during the early twentieth century in Japan.

== W ==
- Andrew Weil – Founder of Integrative Medicine and author.
- Darrell Wolfe – Founder of The Wolfe Clinic
- J. R. Worsley – Founder of Five Elements school of acupuncture.
- Frances Wright – Active in the American Popular Health Movement of the 1830s and 40s.
- P. K. Warrier – Indian Ayurvedic physician who received Padma Bhushan in 2010.

== Y ==
- Yellow Emperor (Huang Di) – Historically credited as the founder of traditional Chinese medicine.
- Maharishi Mahesh Yogi – Founder of Transcendental Meditation.
