= Somatics =

Field of bodywork emphasizing internal sensation

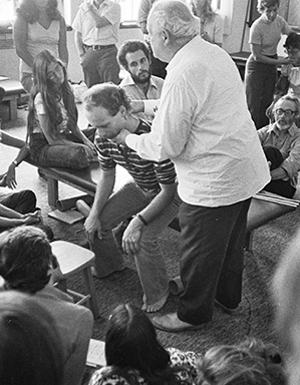
Somatic educator Moshe Feldenkrais in 1978, teaching how to rise from a chair

Somatics describes a field within bodywork and movement studies which emphasizes internal physical perception and personal embodied experience. The term, coined in 1967 by Thomas Hanna, a philosophy professor and movement theorist, is used in movement therapy to signify approaches based on the soma, or "the body as perceived from within", including Skinner Releasing Technique, The Trager Approach, Alexander technique, the Feldenkrais method, Eutony, Rolfing Structural Integration, among others. In dance, the term refers to techniques based on the dancer's internal sensation, in contrast with "performative techniques", such as ballet or modern dance, which emphasize the external observation of movement by an audience. Somatic techniques may be used in bodywork, psychotherapy, dance, or spiritual practices.

== History ==
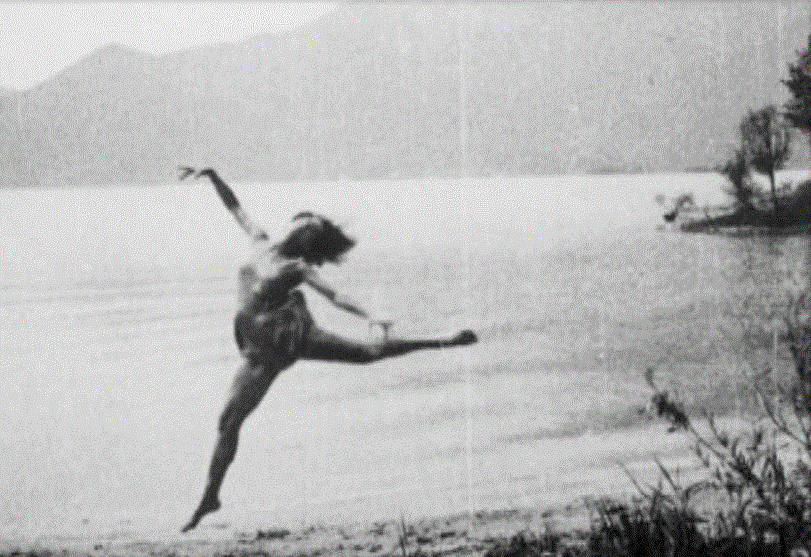
Mary Wigman, who studied with Rudolf von Laban, was among the choreographers whose body-centric innovations influenced the early development of somatics.

An early precursor of the somatic movement in Western culture was the 19th-century physical culture movement. This movement sought to integrate movement practices, or "gymnastics", related to military and athletic training; medical treatment; and dance. Many physical culture practices were brought to the US. One particular American innovator, Genevieve Stebbins, developed her own physical culture system. Some of Stebbins's many followers returned to Europe; one of these trained Elsa Gindler, who is recognized as one of the earliest somatic innovators.

Many further foundational developments in somatics have been traced to the turn of the twentieth century. At that time, the increased popularity of phenomenology and existentialism in philosophy led philosophers such as John Dewey and Rudolf Steiner to advocate experiential learning. Meanwhile, choreographers such as Isadora Duncan, Rudolf von Laban, and Margaret H'Doubler challenged traditional European conceptions of dance, introducing newly expressive and open-ended movement paradigms. Together, these movements set the stage for the first generation of "somatic pioneers", which included Frederick Matthias Alexander, Moshe Feldenkrais, Mabel Elsworth Todd, Gerda Alexander, Ida Rolf, Milton Trager, Irmgard Bartenieff, and Charlotte Selver. These pioneers were active, primarily in Europe, throughout the early twentieth century. Primarily motivated by movement-related injuries of their own, they introduced a variety of techniques intended to help recover from and prevent injury, as well as to enhance physical awareness.

Throughout the twentieth century, this founding generation's practices were codified and passed on by their students, some of whom, including Anna Halprin, Elaine Summers, Bonnie Bainbridge Cohen, and Lulu Sweigard, went on to establish their own influential schools or styles. In the 1970s, American philosopher and movement therapist Thomas Hanna introduced the term "somatics" to describe these related experiential practices collectively.

Towards the end of the century, a trend of "cross-fertilization" emerged, with practitioners combining different "lineages" to form idiosyncratic styles. In recent decades, the field of somatics has grown to include dance forms like contact improvisation and Skinner Releasing Technique, and has been used in occupational therapy, clinical psychology, and education.

== Movement disciplines ==
=== Traditional practices ===
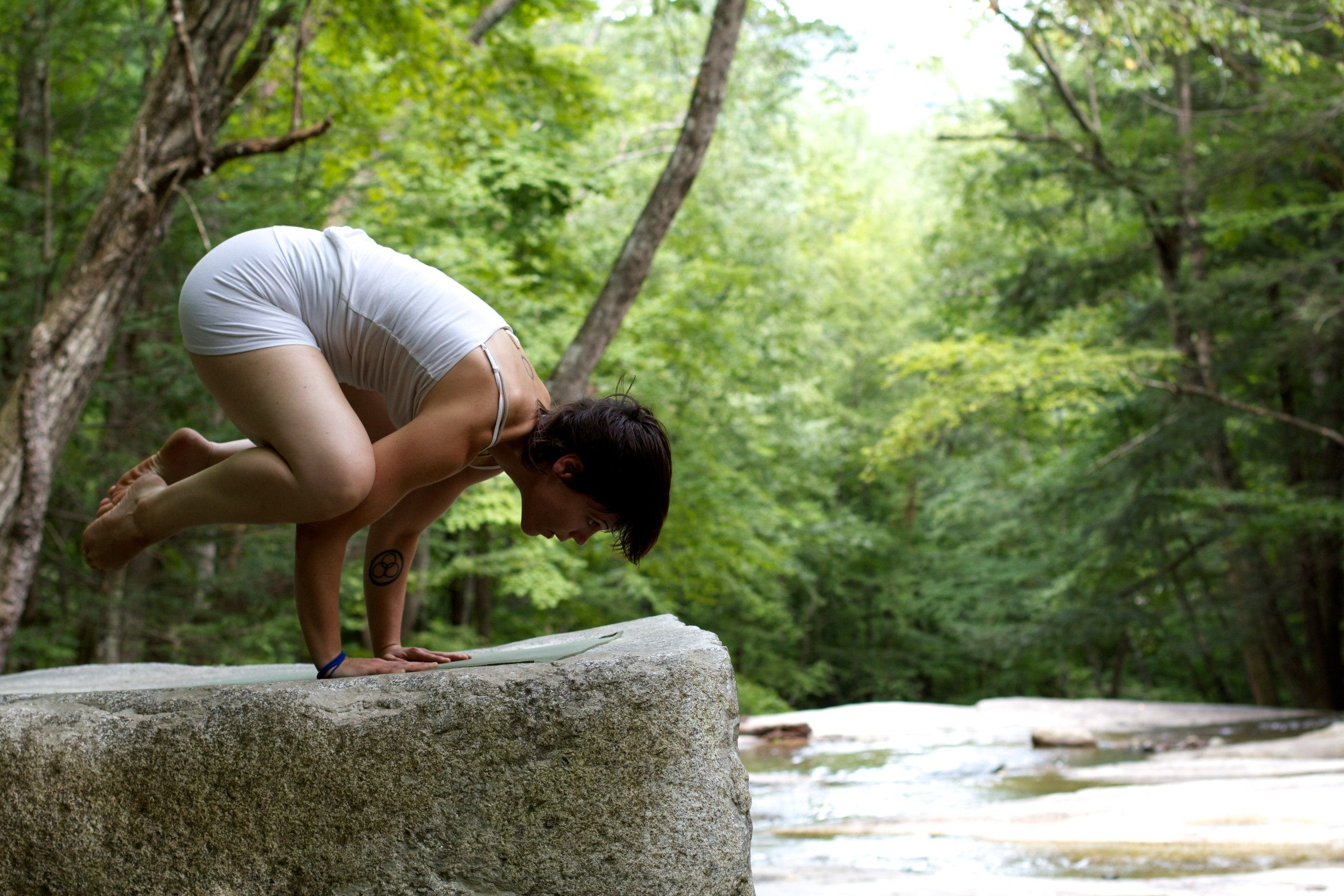
Yoga combines physical and mental exercises

Many traditional Asian movement disciplines influenced the Western somatic practices that emerged in the twentieth century. Aside from prayer, the oldest and most widely practiced somatic discipline is yoga, but many others exist.

Yoga is a group of physical, mental, and spiritual practices which originated in modern-day India before 500 BCE. The ultimate goals of yoga are spiritual, and yoga practice generally involves physically assuming and moving through codified asanas or body positions. Yoga physiology describes a system of interconnected bodies, having different but interrelated physical and spiritual properties. The concept of energy flow through corporal channels reappears in other somatic forms, including contact improvisation and Qigong.

Qigong and tai chi are traditional Chinese movement practices that can serve to support somatic practice. They typically involve moving meditation, coordinating slow flowing movement, deep rhythmic breathing, and calm meditative state of mind. They claim to balance and cultivate qi, translated as "life energy". Aikido is a Japanese martial art that includes internal awareness and an emotional state of non-aggression; some styles emphasize this with separate "ki development" training.

=== Exercise practices ===
The Pilates method was originally developed as a somatic form of physical fitness conditioning in the early 1920s. However, most contemporary forms of Pilates focus on correct physical technique more than proprioceptive awareness. The method's founder, Joseph Pilates, emphasized the somatic principles of mind-body connection, tracking of proprioceptive observations, and attention to breath.

=== Dance ===
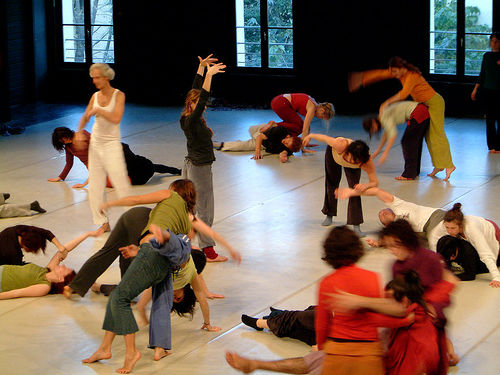
Contact improvisation is a somatic style of postmodern dance

All forms of dance demand the dancer's close attention to proprioceptive information about the position and motion of each part of the body, but "somatic movement" in dance refers more specifically to techniques whose primary focus is the dancer's personal, physical experience, rather than the audience's visual one. Somatics has been incorporated into dance communities around the world, with variations from country to country due to the history of the field's local introduction as well as broader cultural differences.

==== Genres ====
Several dance techniques are considered somatic forms. Contact improvisation is a somatic genre developed by Steve Paxton and others in the 1970s, which consists of two or more dancers responding organically to the physical sensations generated by their mutual contact. Contact improvisation can be performed for an audience, but is not designed to have any particular visual impact.

Ruth Zaporah's Action Theater, developed in the 1970s and 1980s, is an improvisational performance technique based on "'embodied presence', a state of awareness in which performers maintain conscious contact with their somatic experience", according to dance scholar Susanna Morrow.

==== Education ====
Some dance educators use somatic principles and training, especially Laban Movement Analysis, Ideokinesis, Alexander, Feldenkrais method, and Stokoe Method in performative technique classes. These practices are used to train dancers' proprioceptive skills and to adjust alignment, and are claimed to reduce the risk of injury.

Somatic teaching practices are those that build students' awareness of their external environments and internal sensations while dancing. These practices may include making corrections with touch, in addition to verbal instructions; focusing on energy and process rather than the physical shapes they produce; and deliberately relaxing habitually overused muscles. Warwick Long claims that using somatics in dance training, by strengthening dancers' knowledge of the soma, makes their technique more "intrinsic, internal and personalised". He claims the direct self-knowledge somatics offers is valuable for today's professional dancers, who are increasingly asked to work outside the structures of canonically codified techniques such as ballet or Graham technique.

== Alternative medicine ==
Several forms of alternative medicine consider sensory experience of the body important. Western medical sciences also recognize the importance of remapping the sensory experience for conditions such as chronic pain, trauma, stroke and neurological conditions.

One of the earliest somatic education practices was developed by Mabel Elsworth Todd (1880 – 1956). Her work was initially a mental practice for injured dancers, but with contributions from Barbara Clark and Lulu Sweigard, the later naming the method Ideokinesis, the approach gained appeal outside the dance studios for improving posture, alignment, and fluency of movement through structured guided imagery that uses metaphors, such as visualizing an object moving in a specific direction along various muscle groups throughout the body, while lying completely still.

The Alexander technique, also an early example of such a practice, was developed by Frederick Matthias Alexander, an actor, in the 1890s. It is an educational somatic technique intended to undo students' habits of using unnecessary tension in movement.

The Feldenkrais method is a somatic movement pedagogy developed by Moshé Feldenkrais, inspired in part by the Alexander Technique. It aims to improve function and well-being by bringing attention to tension and movement patterns which proponents claim are inefficient or unnecessarily tense and replacing them with more efficient patterns.

Structural Integration, including Rolfing and Hellerwork, uses bodywork, mindfulness, and movement retraining as tools for somatic education. Practitioners claim to make both the body and mind more adaptable and resilient, by improving "alignment" and movement.

Trager uses gentle bodywork and relaxed exercises called Mentastics to explore sensation and effortlessness in movement. Practitioners enter a meditative state and attempt to physically communicate a sense of lightness, curiosity, and playfulness via the practitioner's contact. Mentastics is an exploration of body weight in gravity.

Some alternative medicine practitioners who work with mental health have a somatic focus. For example, in somatic experiencing, clients learn to monitor internal sensations.

== Spiritual practices ==
Spiritual discourse within the field of somatics tends to reject monotheistic systems which locate spiritual authority in an external hierarchy, instead sacralizing the direct perception of an internal "life force". Although not strongly aligned with any particular spiritual tradition, somatics literature generally views Christianity and other monotheistic religions unfavorably and favors an eclectic mix of non-Western approaches to the sacred, including those of Buddhism, Taoism, Hinduism, and various kinds of Shamanism.

Some spiritual practices, such as Sufi whirling and Buddhist walking meditation, are particularly associated with somatics. Spirituality is a component of the work of Bonnie Bainbridge Cohen, a leader in contemporary somatics who incorporates elements of Zen Buddhism with modern dance and Laban Movement Analysis.

== See also ==
- Somatic experiencing
- Somatic effort
