= Eric Franklin =

- Born: Eric Franklin; February 28, 1957 (age 69)
- Citizenship: Switzerland
- Occupations: Dance and movement, somatic education
- Organization: Franklin Institute in Wetzikon Switzerland
- Known for: Founding the Franklin Method

Eric N. Franklin (born February 28, 1957) is a Swiss dancer, movement educator, university lecturer, writer and founder of the Franklin Method, a method that combines creative visualization, embodied anatomy, physical and mental exercises and educational skills.

He lives in Wetzikon, Switzerland.

== Biography ==
He earned his Bachelor of Science from the University of Zurich and his Bachelor of Fine Arts at the New York University's Tisch School of the Arts. After many experiences as a dancer and a choreographer, and Breakdance, a dance book written with William Watkins in 1984, he has founded the Franklin-Method Institute in Uster, Switzerland. He is a member of the International Association of Dance Medicine and Science. He has taught at the Zurich Neurological Institute, the New York University, the Royal Ballet School, the Royal Danish Ballet, the Ballet School of the Zurich Opera, the University of Vienna, the American Dance Festival. He has coached both world and European athletes that became champions, and Cirque du Soleil artists in the Franklin Method.

== The Franklin Method ==
The Franklin Method (in German, Franklin-Methode) was founded in 1994 and was originally for dancers. It was inspired by Mabel Elsworth Todd's ideokinesis, Bonnie Bainbridge Cohen's Body-Mind Centering and Sri Aurobindo's Integral Yoga. Extended from the dance field to every kind of human movement, this method combines dynamic science-based imagery, touch, anatomical embodiment, and educational skills. It was to create a sustainable positive change in body and mind using a range of simple tools like balls, theraband, and other daily life objects.

The Franklin Method activates body and mind function through the use of imagery, experiential anatomy and reconditioning movement to improve function. The principal goals are how to obtain dynamic body alignment and how to move the body with maximum efficiency . In every moment, the ideal combination of limbs, joints, gravity, moving parts, connective tissue, and muscles must be found and directed by the brain and nervous system by help of appropriate imagery.

Imagery promotes a neurogenic changement of muscular condition which allows immediate results, before any myogenic (muscle tissue) one. Connective tissue and inner organs are also directly stimulated, with touch and visualization, in order to change posture and to obtain an inner and outer balance. The exercises have a considerable impact on lowering structural stress, too.

The method is taught all over the world, including the Universities of Vienna, Cologne, Karlsruhe, The Boston Conservatory and the Juilliard School in New York City. It is recognized by the health providers in Switzerland and courses are regularly offered at Dance, Pilates, Yoga and Physiotherapy conferences.

== Publications ==
Eric Franklin is author of 18 books, mainly in the mind/body field, which have been written in German and English and translated into French, Italian, Spanish, Czech, Dutch, Chinese, Japanese and Korean.

Here are mentioned the publications in English:

- Dance Imagery for Technique and Performance, Human Kinetics (1996)]
- Dynamic Alignment Through Imagery
- Relax Your Neck Liberate Your Shoulders, Princeton Book Company (2002)
- Conditioning for Dance
- Pelvic Power, Princeton Book Company (2003)
- Inner Focus Outer Strength, Elysian Editions (2006)
- Franklin Method Ball and Imagery Exercises for Relaxed and Flexible Shoulders, Neck and Thorax, Orthopedic Physical Therapy Products (2008)
- Beautiful Body, Beautiful Mind, Princeton Book Company (2009)
- Happy Feet – Dynamic Base, Effortless Posture, Orthopedic Physical Therapy Products (2010)
- The Psoas – Integrating Your Inner Core, Orthopedic Physical Therapy Products (2011)

- Publications by and about Eric Franklin in the catalogue Helveticat of the Swiss National Library

== Filmography ==
- The Franklin Method: Pelvic Power for Core Integration DVD (2010)

== See also ==
- German Wikipedia article on Franklin Method
- German Wikipedia article on Eric Franklin
- Ideokinesis
- Psychomotor learning
- Sport psychology - Imagery section
- Mind-body intervention
- Body psychotherapy
- Dance science
- Neuroscience

== Bibliography and press ==
- Review of Dynamic Alignment Through Imagery, Dance Research Journal, Autumn, 1997, vol. 29, no. 2, p. 105-108
- Imagery Movement and the Dynamic Dance of Life, by Keith Eric Grant, 1998
- Conditioning for Dance: Training for Peak Performance in all Dance Forms, by Gigi Berardi, Journal of Dance Medicine & Science, April 2005
- The mind/body connection and the practice of classical ballet by Emma Dixon (née Burrows) in Research in Dance Education, Volume 6, Issue 1-2, 2005, pages 75–96
- Teaching Modern Technique through Experiential Anatomy by Jennifer Salka, Journal of Dance Education, Volume 5, Issue 3, 2005, pages 97–102
- Inner Focus Outer Strength: Using Imagery and Exercise for Strength, Health and Beauty by Gigi Berardi, Journal of Dance Medicine & Science, Oct 2007
- Book Review: Inner Focus Outer Strength: Using Imagery and Exercise for Health, Strength, and Beauty, by Glenna Batson, Journal of Dance Education, Volume 7, Issue 2, 2007
- A brief history of somatic practices and dance: historical development of the field of somatic education and its relationship to dance by Eddy, Martha, Journal of Dance and Somatic Practices, Volume 1, Number 1, 1 June 2009, pp. 5–27, Intellect
- Mindful Learning by Virginia Johnson, DanceTeacher Magazine, August 2007
- Free Your Shoulders by Paul Fox, Spectrum, August 2007
- Seeing Improvement by Virginia Johnson, Pointe Magazine, April 2007
- Eric Franklin: transforming technique through science-based imagery by Rachel Straus, Dance Magazine, Jan, 2008
- Franklin Method Images' Effects on Jumping, by Theresa Heiland et al., Loyola Marymount University; College of Communication Studies & Fine Arts; Dance Program; Los Angeles, CA, USA, 2008.
- Imagery takes wing by Robin Westen, Pilates Style Magazine, December 2008
- L'Approccio olistico al personal training, Personal Trainer Journal, January 2009, Italy
- Which images and image categories best support jump height? Heiland, T. Rovetti, R.In: Solomon R, Solomon J (eds): Abstracts of the 20th Annual Meeting of the International Association for Dance Medicine & Science 2010. Birmingham, UK: IADMS, 2010, pp. 74–75.
- The Franklin Method in the Pilates Studio by Marguerite Ogle, About.com, December 2010,
- The Franklin Method: A Revolutionary Approach to Movement by Rosalind Gray Davis, Inner IDEA Fitness Journal, March 2010
- Method Man by Robin Westen, Pilates Style Magazine, January 2010
