= Kinesis myofascial integration =

Kinesis Myofascial Integration (KMI) is a form of Structural Integration (a form of alternative medicine). It involves fascial manipulation combined with movement education. KMI Structural Integration is designed to restore structural balance, ease of movement, and a feeling of ‘fitting in your skin’.

== History ==
KMI is an evolution of the fascial work of Dr. Ida P. Rolf, the movement insights of Dr. Moshe Feldenkrais, the whole-systems geometry of Buckminster Fuller, and many other influences, directed by Thomas Myers.

Myers studied with Ida Rolf between 1975 and her death in 1979, and has practiced Rolfing and been a member of the Rolf Institute since 1976. Searching for a way to teach "connected anatomy", in the early 1990s Myers developed a game of connecting up the muscles in linked series - like the cars on a train - that he called "Anatomy Trains". In 1998, Myers had the insight that Ida Rolf's original Structural Integration "recipe" could be reconfigured in terms of these Anatomy Trains 'lines'. Unable to explore such a radical departure from traditional Rolfing within the Rolf Institute, Myers started KMI, which continues to explore Structural Integration from the point of view of myofascial continuities.

KMI trains manual therapists in the art and science of Structural Integration in a 500+-hr training that takes place in six sessions over a year's time in various locales around the US and Europe.
