= Healing Touch =

Healing Touch may refer to:

== Arts and entertainment ==
=== Literature ===
- The Healing Touch, a 1942 novel by novel by Margaret Malcolm
- The Healing Touch, a 1949 book by J. Harley Williams
- The Healing Touch, a 1995 novel by Elizabeth Neff Walker
- The Healing Touch, a 1996 novel by Janet Dailey
- The Healing Touch, a fictional shop in the novel series The Last Dragon Chronicles

=== Music ===
- Healing Touch, a 2017 album by Darrel Treece-Birch
- "Healing Touch", a 1987 song by Russ Taff from the album Russ Taff
- "Healing Touch", a 1989 song by Saraya
- "Healing Touch", a song by Pretty Maids from the 1992 album Sin-Decade
- "Healing Touch", a 2012 song by Green River Ordinance
- "Healing Touch", a song by Icon & The Black Roses from the 2014 Thorns
- "A Healing Touch", a member from the 1997 musical Violet

=== Television ===
- "Healing Touch", an episode of the television series Noah's Ark
- "Healing Touch", an episode of the television series Twice in a Lifetime
- "Healing Touch", an episode of the television series Strong Medicine
- "The Healing Touch", an episode of the television series All Creatures Great and Small

=== Other uses in arts and entertainment ===
- Healing Touch, a fictional ability in the video game series Trauma Center
- "Healing Touch", an episode of the web series Web Therapy

== Health care ==
- Healing Touch Hospital, a hospital in Rahatani, Pimpri-Chinchwad, Maharashtra, India
- Dr. Ansar's Healing Touch, an Indian healthcare center by C. A. Ansar

== Other uses ==
- Royal touch, a laying on of hands
- Therapeutic touch, an energy therapy
- Healing Touch, an Indian public policy by Mufti Mohammad Sayeed
