= Psychomotor education =

Pedagogic and therapeutic approach

Psychomotor therapy is a pedagogic and therapeutic approach, the aim of which is to support and aid an individual's personal development. It is based on a holistic view of human beings that considers each individual as a unity of physical, emotional and cognitive actualities, which interact with each other and the surrounding social environment.

Psychomotor specialists study the body and its expressivity. The body is regarded not merely as a mechanism with neurophysiological developments, but also as a thing with deep-rooted emotional traits, which have come about through somato-psychic experiences, particularly in early-childhood. Psychomotor specialists work in the field of prevention, education, re-education, rehabilitation, and research. Psychomotor education and therapy can be used for any age group.

A school of psychomotor education, called the Aucouturier Psychomotor Practice, was developed by French pedagogists Bernard Aucouturier and Andre Lapierre.

The concept is very similar to that of somatic psychology, including it's body psychotherapy branch.

== History ==
As early as the 18th century, physical exercise was used in the treatment of psychiatric patients in France, Germany, and England (Probst and Bosscher, 2001). The term "psychomotorics" has its origins in Germany. Wilhelm Griesinger, one of the founders of neuropsychiatry, first used the term psychomotorics in 1844. Griesinger concluded that mental excitement itself can be expressed by the movement and action of an individual, where he sought the causes of mental illness in brain disorders. Psychomotorics is therefore considered as a possible part of physical education with an emphasis on psychosomatics and in the field of medicine, as a supportive treatment therapy. In the Netherlands, Euler wrote about gymnastics for psychiatric patients in 1858 (De Lange, 1998).

in Denmark, psychomotor therapy developed as early as the 1930s, based on body awareness techniques such as Eutony, one of whose pioneers was Gerda Alexander.

After the Second World War, 'movement therapy' was further developed by physical education teachers in the Netherlands. Van Roozendaal made a name for himself with his movement research, and Gordijn developed his “theory of human movement,” which became important for care provision.

Psychomotor therapy was founded in Germany in the mid-1950s by Ernst Kiphard. He adopted the term "psychomotor therapy" from the German rhythmic therapist Charlotte Pfeffer, who published her first essay on the subject, titled "Psychomotorische Therapie" (Psychomotor Therapy), in 1938. Kiphard's years of work with children and adolescents exhibiting behavioral problems, particularly those with relationship difficulties and aggression, revealed that his sports program had a positive impact on their emotional development. Recognizing this therapeutic and supportive effect, he began to systematically expand his movement program.

In 1960, the Dutch Association for Movement Therapy was founded, this later become known as the Dutch Association for Psychomotor Therapy (NVPMT). From the 1970s onwards, movement therapy was increasingly influenced by ideas from psychotherapy. Petzold, coming from Germany to the Netherlands, developed Integrative Movement Therapy, which incorporates many elements from gestalt therapy, for example (Petzold, 1996). Due to this development and the confusion regarding the naming of movement therapy as part of physiotherapy, the name was officially changed to psychomotor therapy in 1975 (Krol and Van Roozendaal, 1975).

Suzanne Naville's move to Zurich in 1969 marked the beginning of the introduction of psychomotor therapy in German-speaking Switzerland. In collaboration with child psychiatrist Alfons Weber, she established an outpatient clinic for psychomotor therapy at the Zurich Children's Hospital. In 1972, the professional association astp was founded in French-speaking Switzerland. It was expanded to cover all of Switzerland in 1978 and has been known as the Swiss Association for Psychomotor Therapy since 2013.

Interest in psychomotor therapy and recognition of its effectiveness led the French government to create a state diploma for psychomotor therapists in 1974. Fifteen recognized training centers exist in France. The diploma currently takes three years to complete. Psychomotor therapy is a paramedical profession recognized by the French government, and has been listed in Book IV of the Public Health Code since 1988.

In 1995, the European Forum for Psychomotor Therapy (EFP) was established. Within this forum, it became clear that there were significant differences between countries regarding theoretical foundations and professional practice. At the same time, this gave a strong impetus to cross-border professional developments.

Since 1995, the Dutch government has recognized psychomotor therapy as a profession within Mental Health Care (GGZ). Together with creative therapists, psychomotor therapists form the arts therapy professional group, one of the six professional groups in Mental Health Care (social workers, psychologists, psychiatrists, psychotherapists, nurses, and arts therapists). Since that time, they have also been represented in the Coordinating Body for Continuing Education and Training (CONO) in the GGZ. This has led, among other things, to the establishment of the Federation of Arts Therapies Professions in 2006, which includes associations for psychomotor, visual arts, drama, music, and dance therapists. This federation has a role in promoting quality, increasing knowledge, and positioning arts therapists.

Since 2002, Danish psychomotor therapy training has been a Bachelor's level program (3.5 years) offered by two higher education institutions.
