= Charlotte Selver =

German-American somatic bodywork educator

- Born: April 4, 1901; Ruhrort, Germany
- Died: August 22, 2003 (aged 102); Muir Beach, California, U.S.
- Occupation: Somatic bodywork educator

Charlotte Selver (April 4, 1901, in Ruhrort (Duisburg), Germany – August 22, 2003, in Muir Beach, California; née Wittgenstein) was a teacher of the Gindler/Jacoby method of awareness and exercise, a somatic bodywork method she further developed and taught after her arrival in the United States in 1938 as Sensory Awareness.

The central point of Selver's work was "experience through the senses". She was convinced that the well-being of the individual, the society as a whole and even the worries about our environment depend on how far we find new confidence in organic processes.

Selver had a deciding influence on the "Human Potential Movement", which was cultivated and named at the Esalen Institute, where she taught as of 1963. Because of that, she also had influence on Humanistic Psychology and the therapies based on it. Aspects of her work, especially the conscious sensing of the body and the following of physical sensations (Sensory Awareness), flowed into many of the methods of physical work, physical therapy, physical psychotherapy and psychotherapy which still exist at Esalen and other venues today.

== Biography ==
In the 1920s, Charlotte Selver encountered Elsa Gindler in Berlin, who together with the students in her courses, researched how the natural gifts of people could be developed, even at an adult age. Up until she emigrated to New York in 1938, she studied with Elsa Gindler and the music teacher, Heinrich Jacoby, and she reestablished contact with them in the 1950s.

In 1971, the "Sensory Awareness Foundation" was brought into being. Its goal is to preserve and document Charlotte Selver's life work. In 1995, the "California Institute of Integral Studies" in San Francisco awarded her an honorary doctorate.

Charlotte Selver died on August 22, 2003, at her home in Muir Beach, California, among her closest friends and students at the age of 102.

== Sensory Awareness ==
Sensory Awareness has its origin in the work of the gymnastics and exercise teacher, Elsa Gindler (1885–1961), and the Swiss music teacher, Heinrich Jacoby (1889–1964). They never gave their 'work' a formal name. The fundamental objective of the Jacoby/Gindler approach is the development of the person (integral unfolding as development and growth to meaningful being). Charlotte Selver was Gindler's student in Berlin before she emigrated to the United States in 1938 and she introduced this work under the name of Sensory Awareness.

== Influences on bodywork and psychotherapy ==
Charlotte Selver touched and encouraged thousands of people in the USA, Mexico and Europe in her 80 years of work, among them influential personalities, such as:

- Psychoanalyst Erich Fromm
- Zen philosopher Alan Watts and his teacher Daisetz Teitaro Suzuki
- Fritz Perls, the founder of Gestalt therapy
- Ida Rolf, the founder of Rolfing
- Moshe Feldenkrais
- Peter Levine, founder of Somatic experiencing
- Ron Kurtz, founder of Hakomi therapy
- Somatics teachers and practitioners including Don Hanlon Johnson, Judyth Weaver, Pat Odgen, Susan Aposhyan, Christine Cadwell, Edward Maupin and others who taught at the Esalen Institute, including teachers of Esalen Massage

== Literature ==
- Brooks, Charles: "Erleben durch die Sinne". DtV, Munich 1991, ISBN 3-423-15085-8. (Charles Brooks describes courses of his wife and colleague, Charlotte Selver. 230 pages with photographs, original English title: Sensory Awareness.)
- William C. Littlewood, Mary Alice Roche: Waking Up: The Work of Charlotte Selver. Author House, Bloomington 2004, ISBN 1-4184-9375-9
- Charlotte Selver: Every moment is a moment In: Deutsches Yoga-Forum, 3/2005
- Sensory Awareness - zur Arbeitsweise von Charlotte Selver In: Feldenkrais Forum, 4/2005

== Sources ==
- "Neugier genügt - Starke Frauen" – WDR broadcast, Friday, October 14, 2005 (11:30 - 11:50, WDR 5) in German
