= Elaine Summers =

American choreographer, experimental filmmaker and intermedia pioneer

- Born: February 20, 1925; Perth, Australia
- Died: December 27, 2014 (aged 89); New York City, United States
- Occupations: Choreographer, experimental filmmaker, and intermedia pioneer
- Years active: 1962–2014
- Career
- Current group: Elaine Summers Dance & Film & Web Company
- Former groups: Judson Dance Theater
- Dances: Overture (1962), Fantastic Gardens (1964), Walking Dance for Any # (1968), Energy Changes (1973), Illuminated Workingman (1976), Crow's Nest (1980), Skydance (1984), Flowing Rocks Still Waters (1985), Hidden Forest (2007), Skytime (1995-present); In films: collage for Overture (with Stand Vanderbeek and Eugene Friedman, 1962), Judson Fragments (1962-65, b/w, no sound), films for Walking Dance for Any # (16mm, b/w, no sound, four-projections-edit, 1968), Illuminated Workingman, Crow's Nest (single edit, color, no sound, 1979), and other intermedia pieces; Absence & Presence (started 1968, finished 1986, b/w, no sound, 12 minutes), Two Girls Downtown Iowa (16mm, b/w, no sound, 11 minutes), Iowa Blizzard (16mm, b/w, no sound, 12 minutes)

Lillian Elaine Summers (February 20, 1925 – December 27, 2014) was an American choreographer, experimental filmmaker, and intermedia pioneer. She was a founding member of the original workshop-group that would form the Judson Dance Theater and she significantly contributed to the interaction of film and dance, as well as the expansion of dance into other related disciplines, such as visual art, film, and theater. She fostered the expansion of performing dance in new, often outdoor locations. Her movement approach Kinetic Awareness offers a comprehensive perspective on human movement and dance.

She died at Bellevue Hospital, New York, on the morning of December 27, 2014, after a fall at her home.

== Early life ==
Elaine Summers was born in Perth, Western Australia and grew up in Boston, Massachusetts with her mother and her younger brother John. Although she took self-paid dance classes through adolescence, she first studied Art Education and received a Bachelor of Science degree from the Massachusetts College of Art in 1947.

== Moving to New York / Judson Dance Theater ==
In 1951 Elaine Summers came to New York and attended classes at the Juilliard School of Dance, together with Paul Taylor and Carolyn Brown. She also studied with Louis Horst, Merce Cunningham, Daniel Nagrin, Don Redlich, Mary Anthony, Charlotte Selver and Carola Speads, (both students of German body-reeducation pioneer Elsa Gindler), Jean Erdman, Janet Collins, and at the Martha Graham School.

In 1962 Summers joined the composition class taught by Robert Ellis Dunn at the Merce Cunningham Studio in its second term, and subsequently became part of the workshop-group that would later be referred to as the Judson Dance Theater, together with Edward Bhartonne, Trisha Brown, Lucinda Childs, Ruth Emerson, Fred Herko, Sally Gross, Deborah Hay, David Gordon, John Herbert McDowell, Gretchen MacLane, Robert Morris, Aileen Passloff, Steve Paxton, Rudy Perez, Yvonne Rainer, Robert Rauschenberg, and Valda Setterfield.

At Judson, Summers shared in the ongoing experiments with chance methods and pedestrian, everyday movements as part of the interest in expanding the then accepted methods of creating and performing dances. However, she also embraced the more theatrical part of the collective (as did Aileen Passloff, John Herbert McDowell and others). Summers expanded dance into other disciplines, experimental film, visual art, and body work. In the later phase of the Judson Dance Theater she created dances that would be made to work with the entire environment of the performance space, notably Country Houses (1963), which included speaking non-sequitor one-liners, and her solo-concert Fantastic Gardens (1964), which included the first large-scale use of intermedia, immersing the entire performance area in film-projections, multiplied by the audience with hand-held mirrors.

== Sources ==
- Banes, Sally, Democracy's body. Judson Dance Theater 1962–64. Ann Arbor, Michigan, 1983
- Green, Jill, The Use of Balls in Kinetic Awareness 1982, JOPERD, Vol. 63 No. 8
- Saltonstall, Ellen Kinetic Awareness: Discovering Your Bodymind 1988, Kinetic Awareness Center / The Publishing Center for Cultural Resources, New York City (out of print)
- Körtvélyessy, Thomas, committed to body choice and intermedia: Elaine Summers. paper dance history, Rotterdamse Dansacademie, 1994
- Körtvélyessy, Thomas, completely coming into moving: Kinetic Awareness for the contemporary dance teacher. paper educational sciences, Rotterdamse Dansacademie, 1996 (written in Dutch)
- Wooster, Anne-Sargent, Elaine Summers: moving to dance. The Drama Review T86, New York NY, December 1980, pp. 59–70
