= KMI =

KMI may refer to:

- Kentucky Military Institute, a defunct military educational institution in Kentucky.
- IATA airport code for Miyazaki Airport in Miyazaki, Japan.
- Koninklijk Meteorologisch Instituut or Königliche Meteorologische Institut, the Dutch or German name of the Belgian national weather service
- AT&T High Seas Service, callsign KMI
- Kinesis Myofascial Integration - an alternative medicine therapy
- Korea Maritime Institute, a think tank and research center developing South Korean policies on marine affairs and fisheries
- Kinder Morgan Inc. (NYSE:KMI), the fourth largest energy company in North America.
