= Violeta Hemsy de Gainza =

Argentine pianist and piano pedagogue (1929–2023)

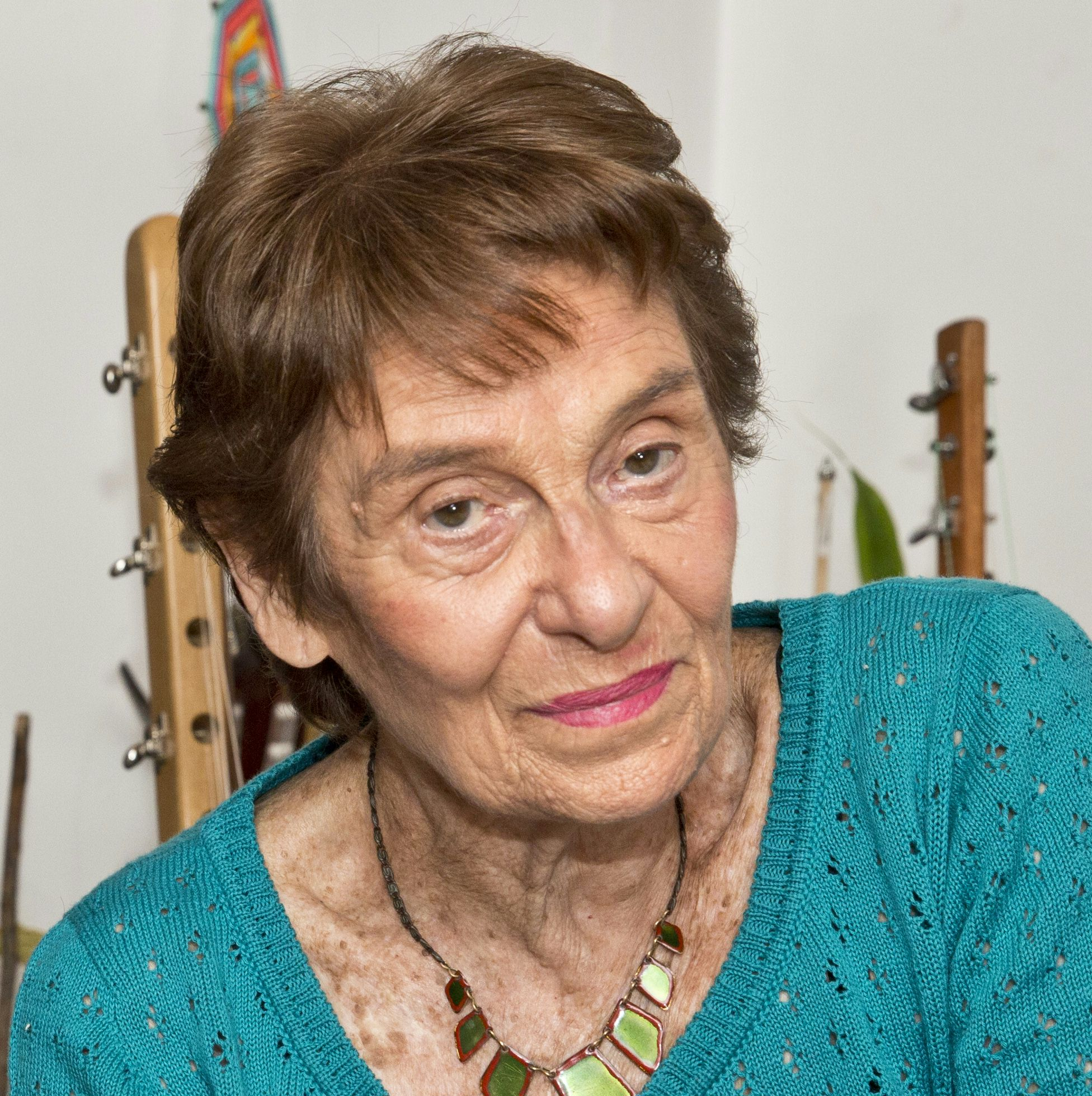
- Hemsy de Gainza in 2015
- Born: 25 January 1929; Tucumán Province, Argentina
- Died: 7 July 2023 (aged 94); Buenos Aires, Argentina
- Education: National University of Tucumán; Teachers College, Columbia University
- Occupations: Pianist; academic teacher; music editor; cultural manager
- Organizations: International Society for Music Education; University of La Plata; Latin American Forum of Musical Education
- Awards: Konex Award (1989)
- Website: www.violetadegainza.com.ar

Violeta Hemsy de Gainza (25 January 1929 – 7 July 2023) was an Argentine pianist and music pedagogue. She focused on the music education of children, improvisation and music therapy, considering learning music a human right. Her books were translated into many languages. She served in international organisations, as a board member of the International Society for Music Education from 1985 to 1990, and as president of the Latin American Forum of Musical Education from its foundation in 1995 to 2005.

== Early life and education ==
Violeta Hemsy de Gainza was born in Tucumán Province on 25 January 1929, to Turkish Sephardic immigrants. Her mother sang French songs to her, and sent her to the Academy of Fine Arts at age six, with her first instrument the piano. She first studied to be a chemist, graduating in 1950. She worked with Walter Seelmann-Eggebert, the father of Argentina's nuclear program. With music becoming more important, she obtained a scholarship to improve her skills at the Teacher's College at Columbia University in New York City in 1951. She completed her studies at the National University of Tucumán in music, focused on piano, and graduating with a licentiate in 1956. She studied in Paris with Gerda Alexander, creator of the concept of "eutony", in 1976.

== Career ==
Hemsy served as director of the Commission of Music Therapy of the International Society for Music Education (ISME) from 1974 to 1986. She was professor of music didactics and improvisation at the University of La Plata, professor of music didactics at the National Conservatory of Music Carlos López Buchardo (1983), and professor at the Municipal Conservatory Manuel de Falla. She was an honorary professor of musical pedagogy at the Metropolitan University of Educational Sciences of Santiago, Chile.

Hemsy was a board member of the International Society for Music Education (ISME) from 1986 to 1990, and co-founder and president of the Argentine Association of Music Therapy from 1987 to 1993. She served as president of the Latin American Forum of Musical Education (FLADEM) from its founding in 1995 until 2005. She was a member of the UNESCO World Council for the Arts in Valencia, Spain. She was also invited as a juror, teacher, and lecturer by universities, conservatories, musical and artistic centers, as well as international organizations such as the Organization of American States, and governments such as France, Germany, Spain's Ministry of Education, and Colombia's Ministry of Culture.

She wrote about 40 publications that have been translated into English, French, German, Italian, Portuguese, and Dutch, ranging from general music pedagogy, piano, and guitar teaching, to children's and youth vocal ensembles, as well as improvisation and music therapy; these are frequently cited in theses and research papers. She wrote a songbook, Tucumán canta, featuring the musical heritage of the Tucumán Province. It was honoured by the Municipality of San Miguel de Tucumán on International Women's Day in 2019. She was a founding mentor of the university choir in Tucumán. She noted about pedagogy:

Es una aptitud y una actitud. Mucha gente me pregunta si compongo; si quisiera lo haría. Mi tendencia a expresar mi creatividad es la pedagogía. Sé que enseño de una manera que no pasa desapercibida y mis alumnos aprenden rápido. Yo les transmito todos mis conocimientos sin mezquinar nada y de una manera muy natural. Aún sigo enseñando. No quiero pasar mi edad sin hacer nada, yo enseño, descanso y sigo aprendiendo.

It is an aptitude and an attitude. Many people ask me if I compose; if I wanted to, I would. My tendency to express my creativity is pedagogy. I know that I teach in a way that doesn't go unnoticed and my students learn quickly. I pass on all my knowledge to them in a very natural way. I am still teaching. I don't want to spend my age doing nothing, I teach, I rest and I continue to learn.

— "Réquiem para una Violeta que prestigió a Tucumán"

She taught generations of students, including prominent musicians such as Andrés Calamaro, María Teresa Corral, Claudio Gabis, Fito Páez, Ariel Rot, and Leo Sujatovich. She was quoted, "Aprender música es un derecho humano. No se necesita para vivir, pero la vida no es la misma sin ella." ("Learning music is a human right. You don't need it to live, but life is not the same without it.")

Hemsy also ventured into the publishing field as director of the Pedagogical Library Musical Collection for the Guadalupe Publishing House, editor of the ISME yearbooks in Spanish, editor of the magazine of the Argentine Association of Music Therapy, and co-director of the Lumen Publishing Group's Body, Art, and Health Collection.

In 1987, Hemsy received the Gold Medal of the Peña El Cardón of Tucumán, and in 1989, the Konex Award diploma of merit for classical music.

During her last years, she had precarious health and turned blind, but kept playing the piano and teaching. Hemsy de Gainza died in Buenos Aires on 7 July 2023, at the age of 94.

== Works ==
- Fundamentos, materiales y técnicas de la educación musical (1984), Editorial Ricordi Americana, ISBN 9789502202167.
- La iniciación musical del niño (1984), Editorial Ricordi Americana, ISBN 9789502202037.
- Método para piano (1984), Editorial Barry, ISBN 9789505400003.
- Música para niños compuesta por niños (1984), Editorial Guadalupe, ISBN 9789505000661.
- A jugar y cantar con el piano (1993), Editorial Guadalupe, ISBN 9789505001842.
- La educación musical frente al futuro (1993), Editorial Guadalupe, ISBN 9789505003037.
- La improvisación musical (1993), Editorial Ricordi Americana, ISBN 9789502202662.
- El cantar tiene sentido (1994), Editorial Ricordi Americana, ISBN 9789502202679.
- Aproximación a la eutonía, conversaciones con Gerda Alexander (1997), Editorial Paidós, ISBN 9789501244205.
- Claudio Gabis: sur, blues y educación musical (2000), Editorial Lumen, ISBN 9789870000242.
- En música in dependencia educación y crisis social (2007), Editorial Lumen, ISBN 9789870006893.
- Conversaciones con Gerda Alexander (2007), Editorial Lumen, ISBN 9789870006817.
