= Somatic effort =

Total investments of an organism in increasing reproductive potential

Somatic effort is, in general, that exerted in the reproductive or juvenile stage and may be regarded as building the soma (phenotype, body, self) that will later be used in reproduction.
