= Janet Karin =

Janet Karin OAM (born 1938 in Perth, Australia) is an Australian dancer, educator, and choreographer. She is a founding member of The Australian Ballet. Karin is recognized for her contributions to dance education and currently serves as the Head of Artistic Studies and Kinetic Educator at the Australian Ballet School in Melbourne.

== Career ==
Karin studied with Laurel Martyn in Melbourne during the 1950s and was a leading member of the Victorian Ballet Guild, performing in productions such as Giselle and Swan Lake. She performed in ballets choreographed by Martyn, including Voyager (as Priscilla), Royal Command, and Sylvia.

In 1962, Karin joined the Australian Ballet as a soloist and was promoted to Principal Artist in 1966. With the Australian Ballet, she performed roles such as the Debutante in Melbourne Cup, Mazurka in Les Sylphides, the Lilac Fairy in Aurora's Wedding, Myrtha in Giselle, the Second Ballerina in Ballet Imperial, and Clytemnestra in Electra.

=== Training and development, 1967 – 1987 ===
In 1967, Karin and her husband, Bryan Lawrence, established the Bryan Lawrence School of Ballet in Canberra, ACT, after leaving the Australian Ballet. The school included a performing arm that presented productions such as Coppélia and Giselle.

=== Artistic Director, 1987 – 1997 ===
In 1987, the school was renamed the National Capital Ballet School, and its performing company became the National Capital Dancers under Karin's direction.

In 1989, Karin was awarded the Order of Australia Medal for her contributions to dance, and Noel Pelly AM became the school’s patron.

In 1996, the company collaborated with the October Ballet Company from Vietnam during a three-month residency in Canberra.

=== Recent activities, 1997 – present ===
Since 1997, Karin has developed dance education programs at secondary and tertiary levels, lectured at the University of Sydney, Australian National University, and the University of Melbourne, and published papers on dance and culture. She is currently the President of the International Association of Dance Medicine & Science (IADMS).

From 1997 to 2001, she served as Assistant to the Artistic Director of the Australian Ballet, Ross Stretton. Currently, she is the Head of Artistic Studies and Kinetic Educator at the Australian Ballet School and serves as the patron of the Laurel Martyn Movement and Dance Education Centre in Melbourne.

In 1997 Karin was appointed as Assistant to the Artistic Director of the Australian Ballet, Ross Stretton until 2001. Currently she is the Head of Artistic Studies and Kinetic Educator at the Australian Ballet School. Karin is the Patron for the (Laurel Martyn) Movement and Dance Education Centre in Melbourne. In 2023, she published The Art and Science of Ballet Dancing and Teaching: Integrating Mind, Brain and Body.

== Sources ==
- Dictionary of Performing Arts Volume 2: opera, dance, music. Ann Atkinson, Linsay Knight, Margaret McPhee. Allen & Unwin 1996. ISBN 1-86373-898-3, ISBN 978-1-86373-898-9
- http://www.natdance.org
- Article title^{[usurped]}
- http://laurelmartyndance.com
