= Dance research =

Academic discipline

Dance research is the study of dance, including dance history, ethnochoreology, dance theory, dance anthropology, and dance science. Dance science is the scientific study of dance and dancers, as well as the practical application of scientific principles to dance. Its aims are the enhancement of performance, the reduction of injury, and the improvement of well-being and health.

== History ==
Dance research as an academic discipline is relatively new. In 1967, the first volume of the CORD Dance Research Annual wrote: "One of the most serious problems in dance research is found in the fact that the literati in the field are not yet the university people". Research methodologies in Dance can include descriptive research, qualitative research, survey research, correlational research, case studies, within-subject experiments, between group experiments, systematic reviews, and epidemiology research. In addition to research concerned with technical or aesthetic aspects of dance, research in the field of dance also often includes connections to scholarly disciplines that place dance in context, including social and literary history, philosophy, anthropology, and medical science.

== Sport science ==
Dance science is the scientific study of dance and dancers, as well as the practical application of scientific principles to dance, similar to sports science. Its aims are the enhancement of performance, the reduction of injury, and the improvement of well-being and health. While the dance sciences span a wide range of domains within which researchers and practitioners have a variety of backgrounds, a unifying interest of those studying and practicing dance science is promoting health, well-being, and optimum performance in dancers.

Typically, the subject areas within dance science are similar to those studied in "sports science", though naturally with a focus on dance and the special considerations that this involves. They include: physiology, anatomy, kinesiology, psychology, biomechanics, nutrition, and similar. However, unlike sports science, dance science sometimes also studies related topics such as creativity and somatic techniques, including the practices of Pilates, yoga, Alexander technique, Feldenkrais method, etc.

== Dance medicine ==
Dance medicine and science as a field of study developed in the 1970s and '80s out of the field of sports medicine. In the early 1980s, the American Dance Festival (ADF) started including dance medicine courses in their coursework for dancers. When ADF moved to Duke University, physicians from Duke University Hospital became interested in dancers. In 1990, the International Association for Dance Medicine and Science (IADMS) was formed by an international group of dance medicine practitioners, dance educators, dance scientists, and dancers. Membership of IADMS began with 48 members in 1991, and has grown to over 900 members in 35 countries as of 2016. It produces a scientific peer-reviewed journal, Journal of Dance Medicine and Science, and holds an annual conference. The Performing Arts Medicine Association (PAMA), which holds its annual symposium in Aspen-Snowmass, Colorado, is an organization that concerns itself with the injuries and health issues of musicians as well as dancers.

== Organizations ==
- Congress on Research in Dance (founded in 1965 as a Committee on Research in Dance)
- Society for Ethnomusicology
- Society of Dance History Scholars
- Cross-Cultural Dance Resources

== See also ==
- Dance and health
- Sports science
