= Trager approach =

Form of somatic education

The Trager approach is a form of somatic education. Proponents claim the Trager approach helps release deep-seated physical and mental patterns and facilitates deep relaxation, increased physical mobility, and mental clarity.

== History ==
The founder, Milton Trager, called his work Psychophysical Integration. He was an athlete, dancer, and bodybuilder. He began doing bodywork with no training and later worked under a variety of practitioner licenses, including an MD earned in Mexico followed by 2 years residency in psychiatry. Trager wanted western medicine to accept his proposed mind-body connection in treating challenging conditions such as postpolio, Parkinson's, and other neuromuscular conditions. Doctors reportedly referred patients to him and were surprised by the results, but "none seemed to consider his drugless treatments as effective as surgery or medication" and the medical approach to these conditions did not fundamentally shift away from them as he had envisioned. Late in life, at the Esalen Institute, he was encouraged to begin teaching, which he did for the last 22 years of his life.

== Practice ==
At the beginning of a session, the practitioner enters into a state of meditation that Milton Trager originally termed "hook-up". From this state of mind, the practitioner uses gentle touch and a combination of passive and active movement with the intent of teaching the recipient how to move with less effort, more freedom, fluidity and ease. The contact is gentle in a sense; it may be quite firm but is without strain or resistance. Certified Trager Practitioners avoid causing pain, and are trained to contact the body in a way that allows the client to feel safe, and to have decreased fear of pain and increased willingness to be present with the full range of pleasant sensations. Practitioners are taught to allow a tone of curiosity, playfulness, and effortlessness to guide their work. In addition to hands-on bodywork, clients are taught a series of easy movements called "Mentastics" to reinforce the pleasant sensations received during the session and engage the brain's neuroplasticity, so that these sensations can replace the old, habitual patterns of discomfort and restriction. While doing these movements, the client is asked to explore how to move with the least tension and effort possible. Mentastics can be done anytime, anywhere and are effective even if practiced for only a few seconds.
