= Gerda Alexander =

Dalcroze eurhythmicist, Dalcroze Eurhythmics student and Eutony creator

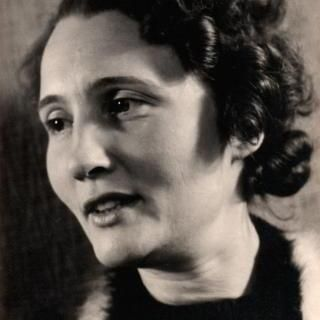
- Born: February 15, 1908; Wuppertal, Germany
- Died: February 21, 1994 (aged 86); Wuppertal, Germany
- Citizenship: Danish
- Education: Blensdorfschule für Rhythmik
- Occupations: Dalcroze euhythmicist, Dalcroze Eurhythmics teacher, Eutony creator
- Known for: Psychosomatics, body awareness, neuromotor rehabilitation, neuromuscular tone regulation, neuropsychological bases of human movement, expressivity studies, artistic development, somatic practices creation

Gerda Alexander (February 15, 1908 – February 21, 1994) was a dancer, director and teacher of Dalcroze Eurhythmics who was born in Germany and later got a Danish citizenship.

Gerda Alexander was involved with the avant-garde movements in the arts, education and body culture in Germany during the early decades of the 20th century, and later settled in Copenhagen, Denmark. Her research into tension and relaxation led her to coin the term ‘eutony’, which was subsequently also used to identify her work (known as Eutony or Eutonie Gerda Alexander®). In developing a lifelong research on muscle tone, Gerda Alexander has collaborated with medical, educational and arts training institutions across Europe, the Middle East, Asia, Oceania, and South, Central and North America.

Gerda Alexander was a pioneer in somatic education studies, and her school in Copenhagen trained professionals for 45 years. The term ‘eutony/eutonia’ has attracted widespread interest, and related methods are taught in professional training schools in several countries around the world.

== Life and work ==
=== Early life and education ===
Gerda Alexander was born in Wuppertal, Germany, and her parents were enthusiasts of Dalcroze Eurhythmics, passing on to her a similar interest in the arts. Her parents avoided telling her explicitly about Dalcroze, but Gerda Alexander had her first contact with his work through some photos of the first festival of the Dalcroze school in Hellerau, followed by a Rhythmics course given by Otto Blensdorf in her city in the same period, and insisted on joining the classes.

She attended the Dalcroze Eurhythmics school of Otto Blensdorf (the Blensdorfschule für körperlich-musikalische Erziehung, lately named as Blensdorfschule für Rhythmik) in Wuppertal from 1915 until 1929. From 1922, at the age of 14, Gerda Alexander began to get involved in the activities, trips, stage productions and as an assistant teacher at Blensdorf's school and its affiliates in Essen, Düsseldorf, Köln, Remscheis, Solingen, etc. Around 1923, Gerda directed her first play open to the public, staging the first two acts of Humperdinck's Hänsel and Gretel. In 1924, Otto Blensdorf opened the Blensdorf-Schule (Dalcroze Seminar) für professionellen Rhythmik-Unterricht, a professional training for those who were interested in becoming Dalcroze Eurhythmics teachers, thus providing the pedagogical foundations of the method. Gerda Alexander was part of the first intake of the Seminar.

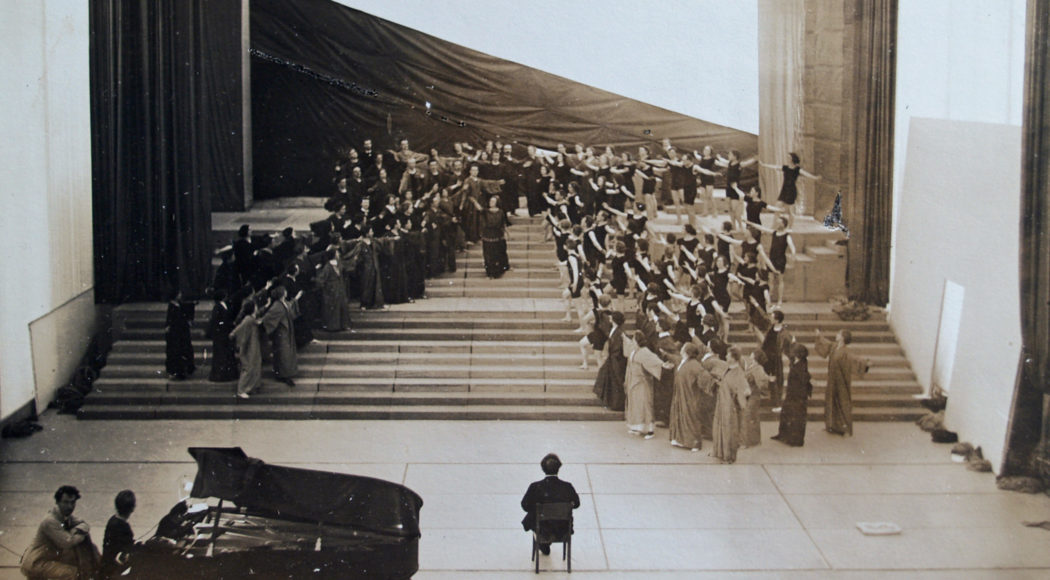
Rehearsal of Orpheus and Eurydice in Festpielhaus Hellerau, Dresden, Germany, 1912

Through her early experiences, Gerda Alexander got in touch with the development of the modern dance in Germany. She performed in the local theatre in Wuppertal (at that time, known as the Vereinigten Stadttheatern Barmen-Elberfeld) and in international congresses through the country in the 1920s (e.g. GESOLEI). In later interviews and remembrances, Gerda Alexander referred to personalities as Rudolf Laban, Mary Wigman, Elsa Gindler, Heinrich Jacoby, Bess Mensendieck, Loheland school (Louise Langgaard e Hedwig von Rohden) and Anna Herrmann, and highlighted how the observation of their students were important on the development of her work. Gerda Alexander also refers to her teaching internships at institutions involved in education and social work, to which she identified as being "the best pedagogical education of my life, being able to come into contact with all these cases, with the guidance of teachers who have profoundly influenced my work".

Between the ages of 15 and 21, Gerda Alexander had several severe attacks of rheumatic fever, followed by heart diseases and culminating in an endocarditis, which was considered a disabling illness in the 1920s. She was hospitalized many times and had to find ways to move that would not overload her circulatory system.

Gerda Alexander graduated as a Dalcroze Eurhythmics teacher from the Hochschule für Musik in Berlin in 1929. During this period, Dalcroze Eurhythmics was taught in all large universities and music schools in Germany due to Kestenberg-reform.

=== Career Milestones ===
After attending the fifth international conference of the New Education Fellowship (founded by Beatrice Ensor), and then being invited to teach at Fröbel schools, Gerda Alexander moved to Denmark. Her early partnerships also included works in Sweden, United Kingdom and across her homeland in the eve of the Second World War. Between 1929 and 1935, Gerda Alexander, in collaboration with Walter Meyer Radon, conductor at the Royal Conservatoire of Malmö, directed the productions of Orpheus and Eurydice, an opera composed by Gluck with a libretto by Ranieri de’ Calzabigi and choreography by Giovanni Maria Quaglio, “He Who Says Yes”, by the German playwright Bertolt Brecht and the composer Kurt Weill, and the opera “Dido and Aeneas”, by the English composer Henry Purcell (1659-1695).

Between 1939 and 1940, Gerda Alexander opened a school for Dalcroze Eurhythmics professional teacher training in Copenhagen, the first to be opened in Denmark. The training was aligned with the principles of the Dalcroze Eurhythmics teaching programmes in England, Switzerland and Germany, and it was partnered with the Royal Danish Conservatory of Music. With the outbreak of the Second World War, Gerda Alexander remained in Copenhagen for most of her life. By her collaboration in the Danish resistance, she was granted the Danish citizenship in the 1940s.

Through the 1940s and 1950s, Gerda Alexander got involved with the establishment of the profession of "relaxation pedagogies" (in Danish: afspændingspædagog), and she can be identified leading several related activities across the country. Currently, the efforts of this generation is recognized by the Danish Association of Psychomotricity as the emergence of the field in the country.

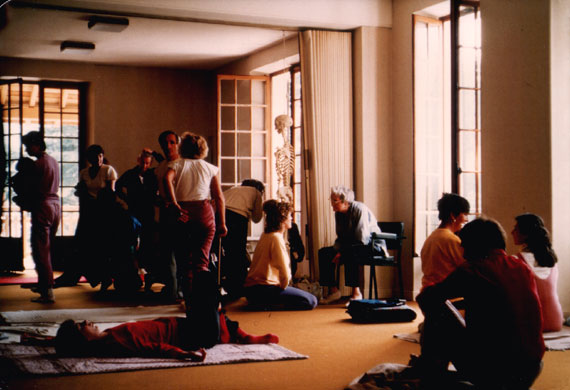
Gerda Alexander, sitting on a chair by the window, talks with a student in Talloires, France, 1985. Source: eutoni.dk

In 1959, Gerda Alexander organized the "First International Congress for Release of Tension and Functional Movement" in Copenhagen with the support of the Danish Ministry of Education. On this event, she gathered pioneering psychosomatic researchers and methods creators (methods later denominated as "Somatics", "somatic practices" or "somatic education techniques").

Gerda Alexander worked with institutions as diverse as the Fröbel College and Fröbel schools, Malmö Symphony Orchestra, Karolinska Institute, Ericastiftelsen, Frederiksberg Folkemusikhøjskolen, Sydsvenska Gymnastikistitut, Private Theater School, Royal Theatre Copenhagen, Theater Academy, Danish Broadcasting House (orchestra, choir and staff), Royal Music Conservatory, Danmarks Lærerhøjskole (Department of Music), Rigshospitalet, Dalcroze Societies, CEMEA (Centres d'Entraînement aux Méthodes d'Education Active, in France), and others. She gave lectures and workshops in Denmark, Sweden, Norway, France, Austria, Germany, Switzerland, USA, Israel, Greece, Italy, Holland, Mexico, Venezuela, Belgium and Argentina.

Gerda Alexander died six days after her 86th birthday in Wuppertal, where she lived in her old age. Her students today continue to teach her work in several places in the world.

== The creation of Eutony ==
By her ongoing reflections with her students of all ages, an enthusiastic inquiry about artistic development and the overcoming of her difficulties, Gerda Alexander developed an original research on body awareness and movement. In her own words: "I tried to find out how I could develop every person's own expression without programming him/her. At the same time, there was my personal need to learn how to survive" and "the creation of the principles of Eutony sprang from two important needs within myself. One was to be cured of chronic ailments which orthodox medicine was unable to treat. [...] My other wish was to develop a new medium for movement expression for opera, drama and dance".

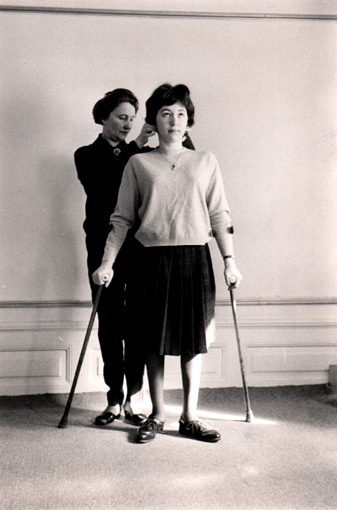
Gerda Alexander with a student on walking sticks, probably in the 1960s. Source: eutoni.dk

Gerda Alexander developed procedures for somatically influencing the regulation of neuromuscular tone. The word ‘eutony/eutonia’ (from the Greek ‘ευ’: good, and ‘τόνος’: tension, tone) was coined with the assistance of Dr Alfred Bartussek. According to Alexander, “we use high tone for exertion, and medium or low tone for rest and sleep. In Eutony, we learn to use the best tone for the action in question".

In the conception of eutony, Gerda Alexander was deeply engaged in developing a pedagogical approach that considers the person's own experience as a living body. The process is based in a student-centered learning approach where sensorial experience and critical reflection are the basis for learning. She postulated that "it is important, in treatment, not to give and do more than is necessary, so that the other can rely on himself. It is not that I am a great master who gives you help. Rather, I can introduce you to my work for your own self-discovery."

The psychosomatic processes initiated by her classes were reported by the students, recognizing benefits in their psychic well-being and in their daily life, and Alexander began to receive medical referrals and make partnerships with medical centers, treating patients that "specialists could not give any hope of improvement" as paraplegic, spastic, amputees, with psychosomatic cases, among others. Scientific theories came a posteriori to support her practices, as she describes "from that time, new finding in neurophysiology have become an important support of our work, and our practical discoveries can be explained step by step".

== The Gerda Alexander School ==
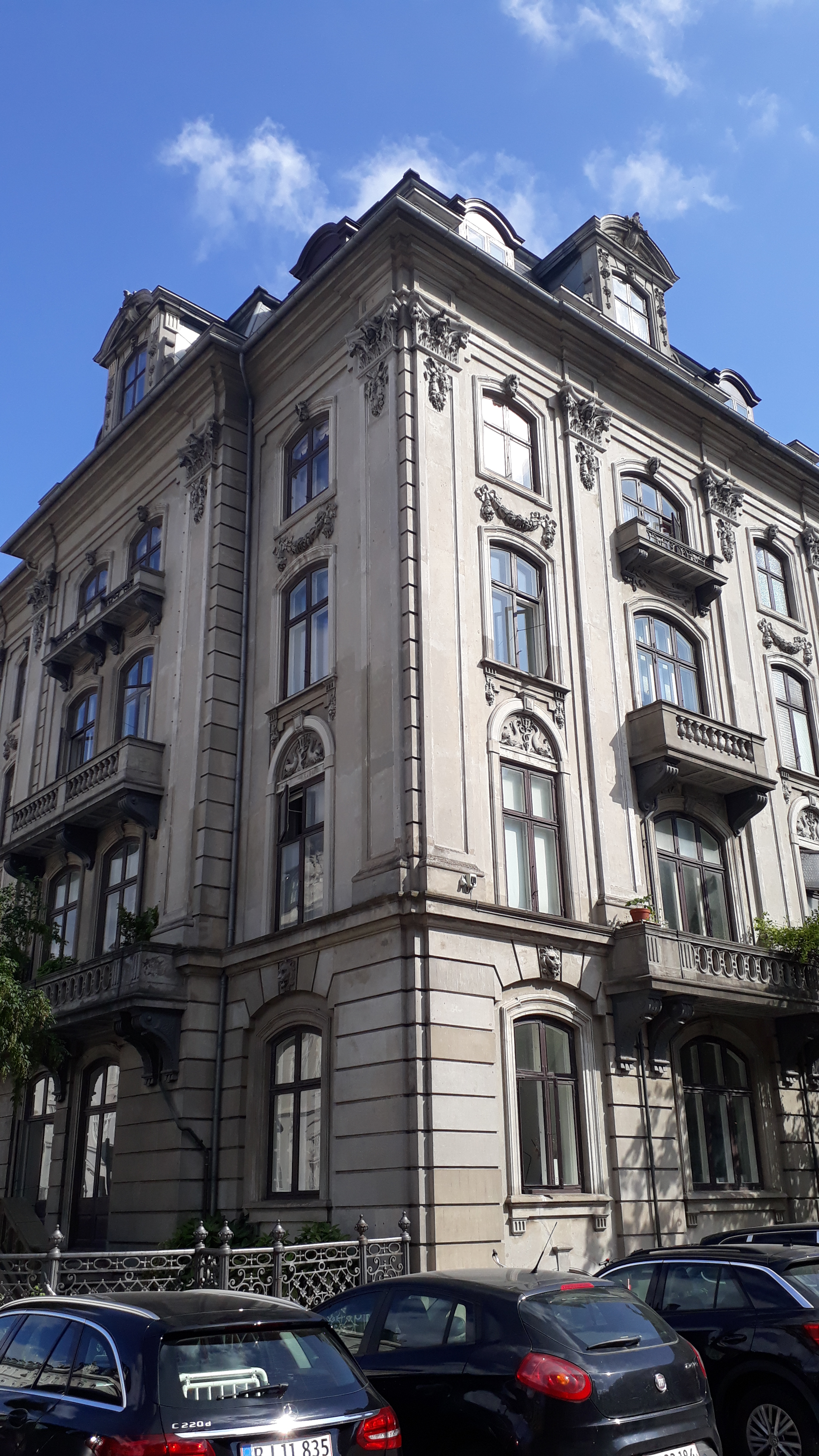
The latest location of Gerda Alexander School at Frederiks Kirke Square, Copenhagen, Denmark.

The professional training in eutony methods includes: eutony (practice and theory, pedagogy and therapy), speech training, psychology, anatomy, physiology, neurology, neurophysiology, neuropathology, psychiatry and seminars from visiting specialists about current development in neurophysiology and other relevant disciplines.

Gerda Alexander first opened a school in Copenhagen in 1939/1940 for teacher training in Dalcroze Eurhythmics. In 1943, Gerda Alexander changed the programme to a three-year training course on relaxation pedagogies, and in 1957, the school got state technical college recognition. As she started to use the word "eutony" to describe her work, the diploma was referred to as "eutony teachers/pedagogues" (in some languages it is common the use of the expression "eutonists"). From the 1970s onwards, the school benefited from support provided by the United Nations Educational, Scientific and Cultural Organization (UNESCO) via the International Society of Music Education. The first branch of Gerda Alexander’s school, the École Suisse d’Eutonie Gerda Alexander®, was opened in Geneva, Switzerland, in 1974, under the direction of Gunna Brieghel-Müller, and the branch in Germany was opened in 1987 by Karin Schaefer. The Copenhagen-based school was officially closed in 1987 by the name "The Gerda Alexander School - International Centre of Eutonia".

== Gerda Alexander's book and translations ==
- ALEXANDER, Gerda (2011). Eutonie - Ein Weg der körperlichen Selbsterfahrung (10th ed.). Bern.
- ALEXANDER, Gerda (2011). SCHAEFER, Karin (ed.). Eutonie: Ein Weg der körperlichen Selbsterfahrung (10ª ed.). Bern: Huber.
- ALEXANDER, Gerda (1985). Eutony; The holistic discovery of the total person. Translated by Gerda Alexander. New York: Felix Morrow.
- ALEXANDER, Gerda (2019). L'eutonie: Un chemin de développement personnel par le corps. Bernard Giovanangeli Editeur.
- ALEXANDER, Gerda (1998). La Eutonia - Un camino hacia la experiencia total del cuerpo. Translated by Ana Rodriguez Leonor Spilzinger. Barcelona: Paidos Iberica.
- ALEXANDER, Gerda (1983). Eutonia - Um caminho para a percepção corporal. Translated by José Luis Mora Fuentes. São Paulo: Martins Fontes.
- ALEXANDER, Gerda (2023). Eutonia - Una via per la consapevolezza corporea. Traduzido por Alessia Degano. Roma: Casa Editrice Astrolabio Ubaldini
