= Ross Stretton =

Australian ballet dancer and director

Ross Stretton (6 June 1952 – 16 June 2005) was an Australian ballet dancer and artistic director. As a dancer, he performed with the Australian Ballet, the Joffrey Ballet and the American Ballet Theatre. He was later Artistic Director of the Australian Ballet (1997–2001) and the Royal Ballet (2001–2002).

== Early career ==
Ross Stretton was born in Canberra in 1952. He started his dancing career as a tap dancer, winning the Australian national tap-dancing championships twice and winning numerous other awards. At the age of 11, he won a Channel Seven Junior Talent Quest, with a judge comparing him to Fred Astaire. In his pre-teenage years, he studied dance with Katrina Druzins, in a small studio at her home in Yarralumla – when dance for young males, particularly in Canberra in the 'sixties, was regarded with curiosity, even suspicion. Druzins, who was a postwar Eastern European emigree to Australia, and who specialised in teaching ballet with a fine degree of discipline, eased Stretton into that form of dance. Stretton, who sacrificed his scholastic studies for his art, did not, however, start studying and performing ballet exclusively until he was 17, when he began taking classes with Bryan Lawrence and Janet Karin, former principals of the Australian Ballet.

He successfully auditioned for a position at the Australian Ballet School in 1971. In his first year, he won the Nureyev bursary and received a Harold Holt Memorial Scholarship in his second year. He graduated from the Ballet School in 1972 with honours in all of his practical and danced the leading male role as the prince in the School's production of Cinderella.

== Dancing career 1973–1990 ==
Stretton joined the Australian Ballet in 1973 and became a soloist the following year. After winning a Robert Helpmann Scholarship in 1975, he undertook a study trip to the US. During his time at the Australian Ballet, he danced all the classical roles in the company's schedule. In the 1977 production of Swan Lake, he developed a strong partnership with Michaela Kirkaldie although he had to be taken to hospital after miscalculating the spectacular leap into the lake in a performance at the Canberra Theatre and missing the mattress behind the scenes meant to break his fall. In 1978, he became a principal dancer with the Australian ballet.

In 1979, he decided to leave Australia for the US to establish an international reputation. Stretton initially joined the Joffrey Theatre before a brief stint at the Northern Ballet Theatre in Manchester. He debuted with the American Ballet Theatre (ABT) in 1980–81. In the following season, he became a soloist with the ABT and a principal the following season. He also worked with Mikhail Baryshnikov in Baryshnikov and Co as part of a select group of ABT dancers.

During his dancing career, Stretton developed a reputation as a great classical dancer although the New York Times stated in a news report on his death that "acting was not his forte". He retired as a dancer in 1990.

== Artistic Director 1997–2002 ==
Stretton started his new career as a regisseur with the ABT combining administrative duties along with responsibilities for casting, teaching and coaching. In 1993, he was promoted to an assistant director position.

He returned to the Australian Ballet in 1997 as successor to Maina Gielgud. Stretton brought new works into the company's repertoire from a range of choreographers including Twyla Tharp. He also commissioned collaborations with the Australian Chamber Orchestra and the Bangarra Dance Theatre. Rites, choreographed by Stephen Page in 1997, featured dancers from the indigenous Bangarra company along with dancers from the Australian ballet.

In 1999, Stretton took the Australian Ballet on a US tour featuring Australian dance works not previously seen in North America. The New York Times described it as a "company reborn" based on that tour. On Stretton's death, David McAllister, his successor as artistic director, stated Stretton "brought the company bounding into the 21st century."

During his tenure at the Australian Ballet, his catchphrase was "creativity, energy and passion". He had the reputation of being a demanding artistic director and was known for having a short temper which meant that he often did not have good relations with his dancers.

Stretton's success with the Australian Ballet led to an offer to take over as artistic director at the Royal Ballet with the intention of bringing new works to the company. His first and only season at the Royal Ballet was criticised with the Daily Telegraph's ballet critic describing it as feeble. In particular, the productions of Don Quixote and Sleeping Beauty were strongly criticised, as was his staging of a Gala for the Queen's Golden Jubilee. Productions of Carmen, choreographed by Mats Ek, John Cranko's Onegin, and Tryst, a new work by Christopher Wheeldon, received more favourable reviews.

== Royal Ballet ==
Following Sir Anthony Dowell's retirement as Artistic Director of the Royal Ballet in 2001, the board of the Royal Opera House announced Stretton as his successor, with a three-year contract, however he resigned the post after 13 months, in September 2002. Stretton's appointment and departure from the Royal Ballet generated the most unprecedented level of media attention for the Royal Ballet in recent years, due to controversy caused by his time at the company.

In the weeks preceding his resignation dancers from the company had threatened to go on strike in protest at Stretton's management style, objecting to Stretton's casting decisions, and to the fact that Stretton frequently made changes to advertised casts. At the time of Stretton's resignation sources at the Royal Opera House, the parent company of the Royal Ballet, suggested that Stretton's failure to develop satisfactory working relations with senior management contributed to his departure. Stretton's own statement hinted at artistic differences:

"Even though I have enormous respect for the great heritage of this company, my interest lies primarily in developing the future of ballet, and that is what I want to spend my time doing."

Following Stretton's departure Dame Monica Mason, assistant director and a former principal dancer with the company, took his position, at first on an interim basis. Mason was appointed Director of the Royal Ballet in December 2002.

It is claimed that a number of issues and allegations led to Stretton's departure from the Royal Ballet:

- Principal dancer Sarah Wildor quit the company after a dispute over casting
- Lady MacMillan threatened to withdraw performing rights to works by her late husband Sir Kenneth MacMillan
- Stretton's programming was badly received by critics
- Equity announced that dancers planned a vote no-confidence in Stretton

The New York Times commented on the artistic and administrative approach of Stretton,

"In his focus on creativity and new choreographers to balance the existing repertory, Mr. Stretton was essentially implementing the policies he had observed at Ballet Theater. He had attempted to do the same as director of the Australian Ballet from 1997 to 2001. There again, he had run into opposition from some dancers and exponents of the status quo."

== Final years 2002–2005, death and posthumous award ==
Stretton returned to Melbourne where he worked as a specialist consultant in dance.

He was diagnosed with a melanoma and died of complications in June 2005, aged 53. He was survived by his former wife Valmai Roberts and his three children.

At the 2005 Australian Dance Awards he was posthumously inducted into the Hall of Fame.
