= Dance and health =

Health benefits of dance

Dance is a physical activity, with many physical and psychological benefits. Dancing can be enjoyed in many forms, and is for every age and ability. This physical activity appeals to some who may not typically be active, and therefore may be another alternative of exercise. Dance for health has become an important factor in the prevention, treatment, and management in several health circumstances. It can benefit both physical and mental health and subsidizes social communication Dance is an art which is learned in and shared between many cultures. Types of dance can entail body movements, expression and collaboration. The correlation between dance and health has been the subject of a number of research studies that show dance to be a largely healthy exercise. However, there are a number of health risks that require attention.

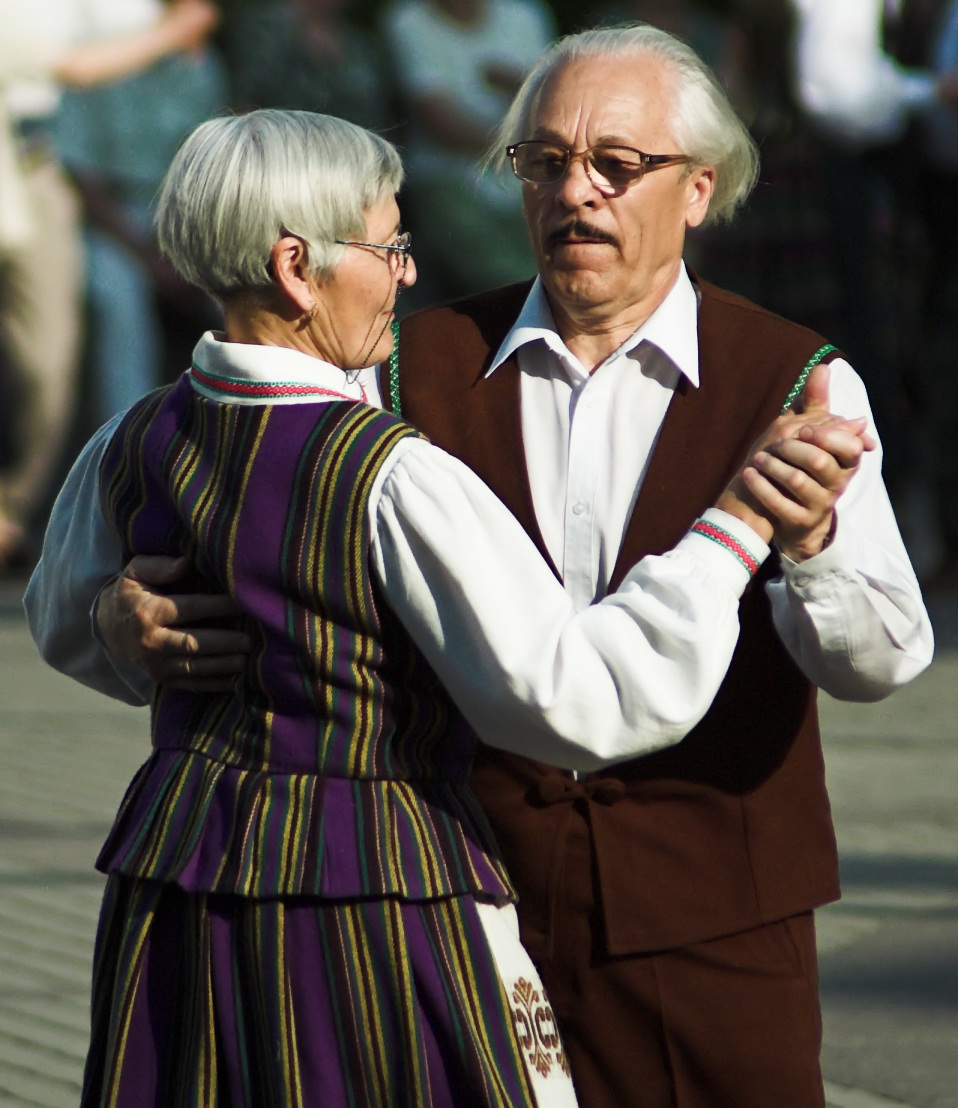
Dancing is a healthy exercise for all ages.

== Uses of dance ==
=== Physical health and fitness ===
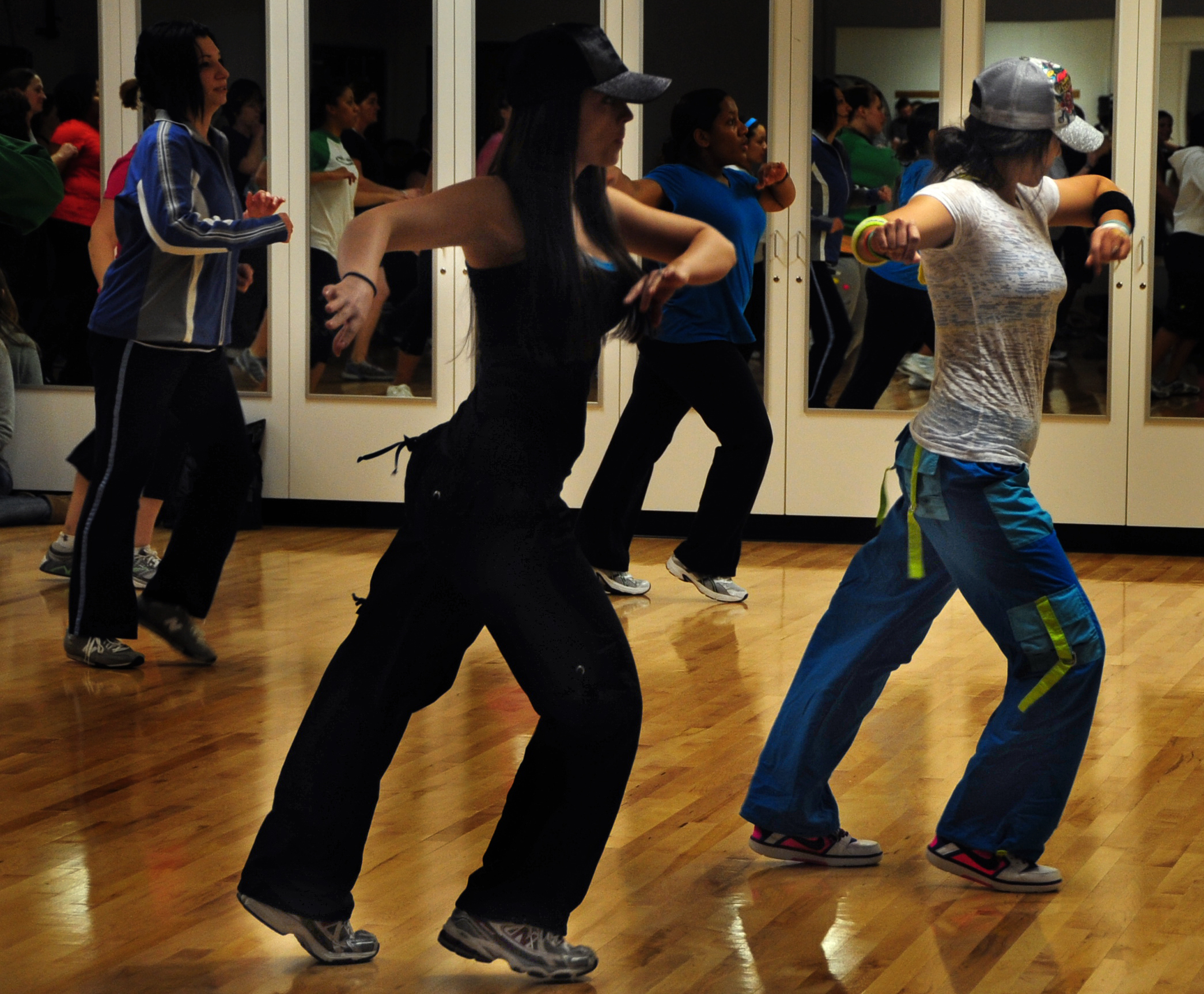
Ellsworth Zumba demo

Dancing can be a way to stay fit for people of all ages, shapes and sizes, having a wide range of physical, and mental benefits including improved condition of the heart and lungs, increased muscular strength, endurance and motor fitness, increased aerobic fitness, improved muscle tone and strength, reduced pain, weight management, stronger bones and reduced risk of osteoporosis, better coordination, agility and flexibility, improved balance and spatial awareness, increased physical confidence, improved mental functioning, improved general and psychological well-being, greater self-confidence and self-esteem, and better social skills. Most forms of dance may be considered aerobic exercise, and as such can also reduce the risk of cardiovascular disease, help weight control, stress reduction, and bring about other benefits commonly associated with physical fitness. In addition, studies have demonstrated a considerable correlation between dancing and psychological well-being. A large amount of governmental, health and educational information is available extolling the benefits of dance for health.

Benefits of Cultural dance

Physical activity has many physical and mental health outcomes; however, physical inactivity continues to be common. Dance, specifically cultural dance, is a type of physical activity that may appeal to some who are not otherwise active, and can be a form of activity that is more acceptable than others in certain cultures.

A 2008 report by Professor Tim Watson and Dr. Andrew Garrett of the University of Hertfordshire compared members of the Royal Ballet with a squad of British national and international swimmers. The dancers scored higher than the swimmers in seven out of ten areas of fitness.

For those with hypercholesterolemia, dancing – in conjunction with diet and medication such as statins – can provide positive health benefits. As an aerobic exercise, abridged levels of total blood cholesterol, especially in LDL cholesterol, are acknowledged as bad and helps boost levels of HDL cholesterol. Dancing in general increases muscle strength and flexibility, which in turn, improves overall range of motion. Dance also increases core strength which can improve balance, coordination, and posture (which can, in turn, reduce mechanical back pain). When focused specifically on pain, a 2022 systematic review found dance can improve pain ratings in a variety of pain conditions.

Dance therapy is suggested for patients today as a treatment for emotional and therapeutic support, as dance allows individuals to connect with their inner-self.

== Risks of dance ==
As with any physical activity, there is always a risk of injury. Dancers are athletes and require many hours of training – which can put a strain on the body. As a result, sports injuries, repetitive strain injury, and chronic workplace stress can be common.

Dancers risk injury within the course of their career, many retiring from active performance in their mid to late 30s. Since dance is a performance art with emphasis on aesthetics, dancers are also at a higher risk of body image problems and eating disorders such as anorexia nervosa or bulimia. Some dances, such as ballet, are very strenuous on the body. Research shows that dancers in elite pre-professional companies have 1.38 injuries per 1000 hours of dancing, with dancers averaging about 30.3 hours per week. The most common injury was to the lower extremities, with ankle being the most common. The injuries on average took about 7 days to heal with foot injuries taking the longest at 14 days and thigh injuries being the lowest at 2 days. Another risk dancers face are eating disorders. They are constantly judged based on their looks and expected to have toned, slim bodies. This can lead to a lot of health risks.

=== Injuries ===
...compared to the 61 common sports, only professional [American] football is more physically demanding than ballet.

Many dance movements, and particularly ballet techniques, such as the turnout of the hips and rising on the toes (en pointe), test the limits of the range of movement of the human body. Dance movements can place stress on the body when not performed correctly; even if perfect form is used, over-repetition can cause repetitive strain injury. The most common injuries for ballet dancers are snapping hip syndrome and foot and ankle injuries. A dancer's feet and ankles are vulnerable to a wide range of injuries including stress fractures, tendon injuries, sprains and strains. Much of this is due to not only the emphasis of footwork in dance, but also the footwear. Dancers either wear pointe shoes, bare feet, a soft shoe of some kind or heels, all of which offer no support. Shoulder injuries can be common in male dancers due to lifting, partnering and floor work that is commonly seen in modern dance. The periscapular muscles assist in keeping the shoulder still and steady, these muscles are at greater risk for injuries among dancers.

Examined in the Journal of Dance Medicine and Science, dancers often put off consultation from doctors or physical therapists in the effort to stay employed by a dance company or to stay in rehearsals. When in fact those dancers that "work through" their pain more often than not end up worsening their symptoms and prolonging their recovery. Eighty percent of professional dancers will be injured in some way during their careers; 50 percent of dancers from large ballet companies and 40 percent from small companies will miss performances due to injury.

Overwork and poor occupational health and safety conditions, a (non-sprung) hard floor, a cold studio or theater, or dancing without sufficient warm up also increase risk of injury. To minimize injury, dance training emphasizes strength building and forming appropriate habits. Choreographers and dance instructors will often put certain demands on their students and dancers without taking into consideration that each dancer is faced with different anatomical limitations. Dancers will strive to achieve the ideal aesthetic in their respective dance technique by over compensating for their limitations and thus presenting themselves with a higher risk for injury. Damage may also result from having a student perform movements for which they are not prepared, care must be taken that the student is not "pushed" inappropriately.

A dancer put en pointe at an age where their bones have not completely ossified may develop permanent damage; even past the point of ossification, ankle injuries can result if a dancer goes en pointe without sufficient strength. According to a study conducted by Rachele Quested and Anna Brodrick, the lower extremities are the most vulnerable to injury. The most common injury is to the ankle, then leg, foot, knee, hip and finally the thigh. Dancers are trained from a very young age to avoid injury by using plie, turn out, and other means to protect their bodies.

==== Avoiding injury ====
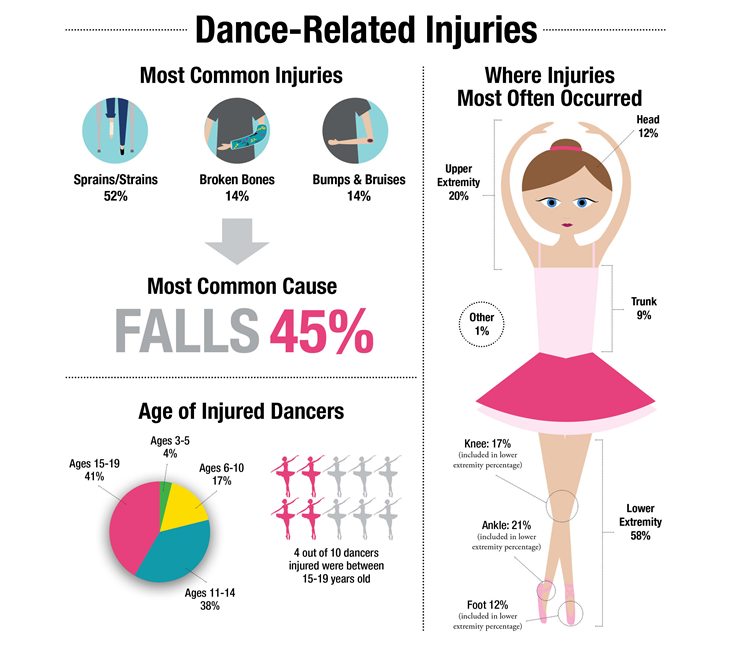

Keeping dancers free of injury is a crucial aspect and will help a lifetime of healthy physical activity and can prevent injuries in the future. By being taught a few simple techniques by parents, teachers, and medical professionals can avert injuries from occurring. Following are a few advice's on preventing injuries. Wearing properly fitting clothing and shoes, drink plenty of fluids to stay hydrated, do not dance through pain, rest and then start back up again and listen to your teachers for correct technique. For social dance the use of a sprung floor is highly recommended. Because a dance injury can ruin a career professional dancers are increasingly refusing to dance on anything else. In ballet, good pliés (bending the knees) on landing helps protect against knee injuries and shin splints. Many types of dance, especially folk dances, have hops in the steps where the impact of landing can be reduced by slightly bending the knee. Warming up and cooling down exercises are recommended before and after exercises to avoid strain, muscle pains, and possible injury. Conditioning is a good way to prevent dance injuries.

==== Treatment of injuries ====
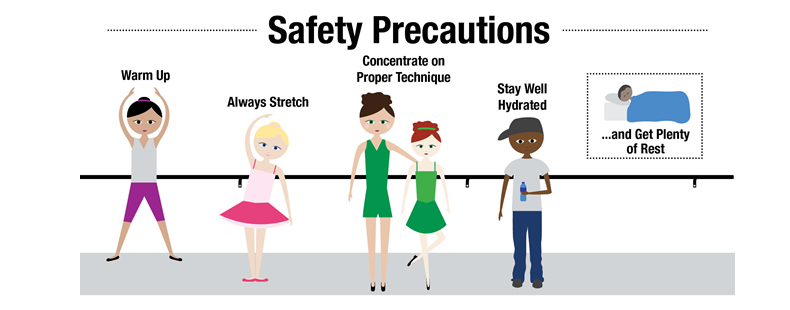

RICE (Rest, Ice, Compression, Elevation) is generally regarded as a good first aid therapy for most dance injuries before an ambulance arrives, or even for what may be thought of as minor injuries. Pain and inflammation can be reduced using a non-steroidal anti-inflammatory drug (NSAID) in a gel applied to the affected area (not on broken skin). Note, however, that masking pain to continue dancing is dangerous as it can easily make an injury worse.

=== Stress ===
Professional dancers may experience chronic workplace stress due to uncertain work security and shifting work environments. The average income for a ballet dancer is low, and competition for jobs is very high. The median hourly wage for dancers was estimated at $17.49 in May 2019. In addition to the stress that may be caused by this, dancers also may experience the psychological distress from technical and physical perfectionism. In a survey of 300 professional dancers, 40% were tobacco smokers in contrast with the Centers for Disease Control average of 24% of American women and 29% of American men aged 18–34.

=== Body image and disordered eating ===
As with other activities (such as horse jockeying) where weight is a factor, dancers are at a higher risk for developing eating disorders such as anorexia and bulimia. According to research, about 12% of dancers have eating disorders and 16.4% of ballet dancers have eating disorders. Many young dancers, believing that the ideal dancer must be thin, may begin controlling their diets, sometimes obsessively. There are high standards, one of which being the idea of perfectionism and having the ideal body shape. Many dancers feel pressure to achieve this goal. Because of this, dancers are three times as likely to develop eating disorders, more particularly anorexia nervosa and EDNOS. Such dancers may be unaware of or may choose to ignore the fact that an emaciated dancer will not have the strength required for ballet. Inadequate nutrition in adolescent females has been linked to development of scoliosis, due to decreased oestrogen production and subsequent reduced bone density. A dancer with poor nutrition is at a higher risk for injuries and long-term health problems. A malnourished dancer's performance will be altered and weaken as his or her body starts to break down muscle and bone in order to fuel itself. This puts the dancer at risk for injury and slows healing.

== Scientific study of dance ==
Dance science is the scientific study of dance and dancers, as well as the practical application of scientific principles to dance. Its aims are the enhancement of performance, the reduction of injury, and the improvement of well-being and health. Dance requires a high degree of interpersonal and motor skills, and yet seems built into humans. It has therefore increasingly become the subject of neurological studies. The July 2008 edition of Scientific American contains a summary of recent studies and further questions.

== Related occupations ==
Dance therapy or dance movement therapy is a form of expressive therapy, the psychotherapeutic use of movement (and dance) for treating emotional, cognitive, social, behavioral and physical conditions. Many professionals specialize in dancer's health such as in providing complementary or remedial training or improving mental discipline.
