= C. A. Ansar =

Indian medicinal practitioner

- Born: Kochi, Kerala, India
- Education: Sri Jayendra Saraswathi Ayurveda College and Hospital
- Years active: Since 2007
- Known for: Alternative medicine
- Medical career
- Profession: Alternative medical practitioner
- Institutions: Taj Residency; Dr. Ansar's Healing Touch
- Awards: 2014 Chavara Excellence Award; 2017 GoK Social Justice Award
- Website: Official website

C. A. Ansar is an Indian visually impaired practitioner of alternative medicine and the chief consultant at Dr. Ansar's Healing Touch, a healthcare center based in Kochi. He is known for his alternative medical practice which combines the therapeutic techniques of reflexology, yoga, naturopathy and ayurveda. The Ministry of Health and Family Welfare of the Government of Kerala awarded him the Social Justice Award in 2017 for his contributions in the field of healthcare.

== Early life and education ==
C. A. Ansar was born in the south Indian state of Kerala, he did his post-graduate studies in Panchakarma (Ayurveda) at Sri Jayendra Saraswathi Ayurveda College and Hospital, Chennai. It was during this period, he was diagnosed with Glaucoma, a disease which affects the optic nerve, eventually leading to blindness, He completed the studies but soon afterwards, lost his vision completely in 2007. However, he continued his studies and underwent training in Swedish massage, Sujok therapy and Yoga in India and in reflexology in China, Indonesia, Malaysia and Thailand.

== Work ==
Ansar subsequently, after obtaining practitioner's licence from the Indian Board of Alternative Medicines, he started his practice at Taj Residency, Kochi (present day Gateway Hotel Cochin) as a reflexologist, but soon set up his own private practice, Dr. Ansar's Healing Touch Health Centre, in the city, where he has trained and employed visually impaired people as therapists. He also delivers motivational speeches at various seminars. The Chavara International Institute for Visually Challenged awarded him the Chavara Excellence Award in 2014. He received the Social Justice Award of the Ministry of Health and Family Welfare of the Government of Kerala in 2017.

== See also ==
- Qi
- Vitalism
- List of people in alternative medicine
