= Darrell Wolfe =

Canadian naturopath

Darrell Wolfe is the Canadian founder of The Wolfe Clinic in Toronto, and is most notable for being accused of quackery by the Canadian Broadcasting Corporation.

== Career ==
Wolfe's own website describes him as a doctor of natural medicine, and he describes himself as a "health practitioner", and the "Doc of Detox".

In 1991, Wolfe wrote an article that claimed that milk was dangerous and polluted with toxins, prompting litigation and a retraction from the magazine's publisher. In 1994, the Canadian Broadcasting Corporation television program show Marketplace reported on Wolfe selling machines that claimed to cure HIV/AIDS via the rectal administration of ozone. Wolfe sold the machines from his business, The Wolfe Clinic, in Toronto. After closing the clinic, Wolfe began operating from the city of Ixtapa in Mexico, from where he sells educational programs and purported cures for diseases including cancer.
