= International Association for Dance Medicine & Science =

The International Association for Dance Medicine & Science (IADMS) was formed in 1990 with the goal summarized in its mission statement: IADMS is an inclusive organization for professionals who care for those who dance by evolving best practices in dance science, education, research, and medical care to support optimal health, well-being, training, and performance.

As at 2020, the association had a membership of over 1,500 from over 52 countries.

Since its inception, the association has held an annual meeting (scientific conference) at venues around the world. These conferences, currently four days in length, are multidisciplinary, with lectures, symposia, and forums on dance medicine, dance science, and dance education, as well as movement sessions. The conferences are attended by physicians, physical therapists, allied health professionals, alternative healthcare practitioners, psychologists, arts administrators, artistic directors, choreographers, dance educators, dance scientists, movement specialists, and dancers. Continuing education credits for healthcare professionals are provided.

The association publishes a quarterly peer-reviewed scientific journal, Journal of Dance Medicine & Science (by subscription, print and online) which is indexed in MEDLINE and The IADMS Bulletin for Teachers (free, online only).

Resource papers on numerous topics and in several languages, written by medical, scientific, and dance professionals, are available for free download on the association's website.

== Presidents ==
- 1991–1993 Justin Howse, FRCS (Eng) and Allan Ryan, MD
- 1993–1997 Jan Dunn, MS
- 1997–1999 Robert Stephens, PhD
- 1999–2001 Marika Molnar, PT
- 2001–2003 David S. Weiss, MD, FAAOS
- 2003–2005 Rachel Rist, MA
- 2005–2007 Virginia Wilmerding, PhD
- 2007–2009 Boni Rietveld, MD
- 2009–2011 Tom Welsh, PhD
- 2011–2013 Emma Redding, PhD
- 2013–2015 Janet Karin
- 2015–2017 Matthew Wyon, PhD
- 2017–2019 Peter Lavine, MD
- 2019–2021 Peter Lewton-Brain, DO, MA
- 2021-2023 Nancy Kadel, MD
- 2023-2025 Kathleen Davenport, MD
