= Heinrich Jacoby =

German educator and musician

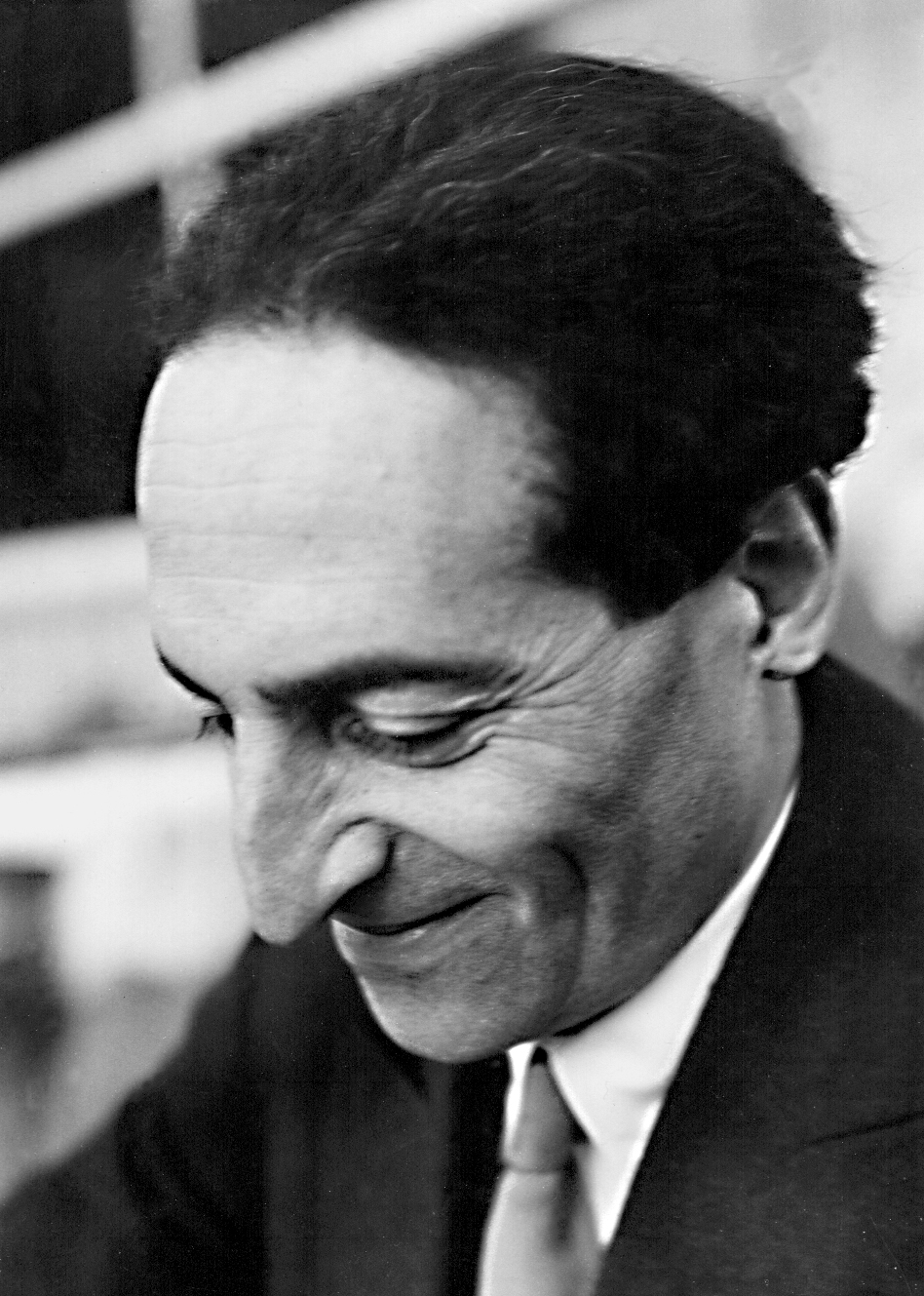
Heinrich Jacoby

Heinrich Jacoby (1889–1964), originally a musician, was a German educator whose teaching was based on developing sensitivity and awareness. His collaboration with his colleague Elsa Gindler (1885–1961), whom he met in 1924 in Berlin, played a great role in his researches. With the advent of Nazism in 1933 Jacoby was forced to leave Germany, but he continued his work in Switzerland.

Jacoby and Moshe Feldenkrais were among a small group of European 20th-century innovators who emphasized the "self" in self-development, so that as in the zen inspired arts such as archery or judo, or even flower arranging, a skill was not an end in itself. Practicing a skill was a path to greater awareness.

The work of Heinrich Jacoby influenced body psychotherapy through the workshops that Charlotte Selver (1901–2003), a student of Jacoby and Gindler, gave to major body psychotherapists at the Esalen Institute in the 1960s.
