= Mabel Elsworth Todd =

American somatic educationalist

- Born: Mabel Ellsworth Todd; June 5, 1880; Syracuse, Onondaga, New York, United States
- Died: December 14, 1956 (aged 76); Los Angeles, California, United States
- Resting place: Oakwood Cemetery, Syracuse, Onondaga, New York, United States
- Parent(s): Luzerne A. Todd and Maria nee Rogers

Mabel Elsworth Todd (1880 – 1956) is known as the founder of what came to be known as 'Ideokinesis', a form of somatic education that became popular in the 1930s amongst dancers and health professionals. Todd's ideas involved using anatomically based, creative visual imagery and consciously relaxed volition to create and refine neuromuscular coordination. Lulu Sweigard, who coined the term Ideokinesis, and Barbara Clark furthered Todd's work.

Todd's work was published in her book 'The Thinking Body' (1937), which is now considered by modern dance schools to be a classic study of physiology and the psychology of movement. Her work influenced many somatic awareness professionals of her day, and is often cited along with the Feldenkrais method and Body-Mind Centering for its focus on the subtle influence of unconscious intention and attention.

== Publications ==
- Todd, M. Early Writings, 1920-1934. Reprint. New York: Dance Horizons.
- Todd M. The Thinking Body. 1937. Reprint. New York: Dance Horizons. ISBN 0-8712-7014-5
- Todd M. The Hidden You. Reprint. New York: Dance Horizons, 1953.
