= Ideokinesis =

Body movement methodology

Ideokinesis is an approach to improving posture, alignment, and fluency of movement through structured guided imagery that uses metaphors, such as visualizing an object moving in a specific direction along various muscle groups throughout the body, while lying completely still. Proponents claim that repeated practice of this particular formula of mental imagery translates to improved coordination in dance and in movement in general "based on the idea that imagery can improve skeletal alignment and posture through the re-patterning of neuromuscular pathways in the absence of overt movement". Although there is some evidence that rehearsal-style mental imagery may benefit performance in sports, there is currently insufficient data to draw conclusions on the effectiveness of metaphorical imagery as only personal and experimental research has been conducted on ideokinesis and there are reasons to believe it may be contraindicated as a relaxation technique.

Ideokinesis was originally developed as a form of mental practice for injured dancers, but some dance schools have integrated it into a standard somatics protocol for all dancers because it is thought to optimize motor control and performance by using periods of rest constructively. Known among followers as "the Work", "ideokinesis" is sometimes used interchangeably with other terms, such as "mental practice", "mental rehearsal", "visuomotor behavior rehearsal", "covert rehearsal", and "ideokinetic facilitation", among others.

Mabel Todd conceived the ideokinesis approach; Barbara Clark and Lulu Sweigard, and others contributed to its early evolution; later, André Bernard, Irene Dowd, Erick Hawkins, Pamela Matt, Eric Franklin and others lent their influence.

Sweigard borrowed the word ideokinesis, composed by two Greek words: ideo (thought) and kinesis (movement), from Bonpensière, a piano teacher, who applied imagery to his methodology. Ideokinesis can be translated roughly as "the image or thought as facilitator of movement".
