= Elsa Gindler =

German somatic bodywork pioneer

Elsa Gindler (19 June 1885 – 8 January 1961) was a somatic bodywork pioneer in Germany.

Born in Berlin, teacher of gymnastik, student of Hedwig Kallmeyer (who, in turn, had been a student of Genevieve Stebbins).

From her personal experience of recovering from tuberculosis (it is said by concentrating on breathing only with her healthy lung and resting the diseased lung), Gindler originated a school of movement education, in close collaboration with Heinrich Jacoby.

What Gindler had called Arbeit am Menschen (work on the human being) emphasised self-observation and growing understanding of one's individual physically related condition. Simple actions such as sitting, standing, and walking were explored, as well as other everyday movements.

This became one of the bases of body psychotherapy since many of the most influential body psychotherapists studied with her or "Sensory Awareness" with Charlotte Selver at the Esalen Institute around 1962.

During the Nazi-period of Germany, Gindler used these investigations and experimental exercises with her students to covertly help people who were persecuted by the regime.

== Students and Collaborators ==
Gindler's collaborators included

- Emmi Pikler
- Heinrich Jacoby (whose students included Moshe Feldenkrais)

Several of Gindler's students went on to become influential teachers themselves:

- Elsa Lindenberg (partner of Wilhelm Reich)
- Laura Perls (wife of Fritz Perls and co-creator of Gestalt Therapy)
- Charlotte Selver (Sensory Awareness)
- Carola Speads (Physical Re-Education) (Berta Bobath) Bobath concept
- Gertrud Heller
- Lily Ehrenfried (Methode Ehrenfried / Gymnastique Holistique)
- Clare Fenichel
- Sophie Ludwig (1901–1997)
- Ruth Matter (1904–1995)

Gindler's student Charlotte Selver emigrated to the United States in 1938, and later became one of the first teachers at Esalen Institute where she would frequently credit Gindler. Through Selver's Sensory Awareness workshops at Esalen and elsewhere, Gindler's work indirectly influenced most of the somatic teachers in the United States.

== Sources ==
- History of Esalen Institute
- German Wikipedia article on Elsa Gindler (translation requested)
