= Feldenkrais method =

Exercise therapy

The Feldenkrais Method (FM) is a type of movement therapy devised by Moshé Feldenkrais (1904–1984) during the mid-20th century. The method is claimed to reorganize connections between the brain and body and so improve body movement and psychological state.

There is no conclusive evidence for any medical benefits of the therapy. However, researchers do not believe FM poses serious risks.

== Description ==
The Feldenkrais Method is a type of alternative movement therapy that proponents claim can repair impaired connections between the motor cortex and the body, so benefiting the quality of body movement and improving wellbeing. Practitioners view it as a form of somatic education "that integrates the body, mind and psyche through an educational model in which a trained Feldenkrais practitioner guides a client (the 'student') through movements with hands-on and verbally administered cues," according to Clinical Sports Medicine.

The Feldenkrais Guild of North America claims that the Feldenkrais method allows people to "rediscover [their] innate capacity for graceful, efficient movement" and that "These improvements will often generalize to enhance functioning in other aspects of [their] life".

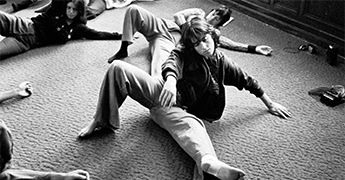
Students at the San Francisco Feldenkrais Practitioner Training doing an Awareness Through Movement lesson (1975)

The Oxford Handbook of Music Performance describes FM as "an experiential learning process that uses movement and guided attention to develop and refine self-awareness." It notes that FM is "increasingly used among high-level performers, such as musicians, actors, dancers, and athletes."

Feldenkrais lessons have two types, one verbally guided and practiced in groups called Awareness Through Movement, and one hands-on and practiced one-to-one called Functional Integration. Moshé Feldenkrais wrote, "The purpose of these sensorimotor lessons is to refine one's ability to make perceptual distinctions between movements that are easy and pleasurable and those that are strained and uncomfortable, which results in the discovery of new movement possibilities as well as potential for further improvements."

=== Five principles ===
FM operates broadly within five principles:

1. Learning is a process: "relies on sensory and kinesthetic information that one experiences through interactions with the environment"
2. Posture as dynamic equilibrium: "the ability to regain equilibrium after a large disturbance"
3. Exploratory versus performative movement: "the ability to make distinctions in the ease and quality of movement and to try out movements that may be unfamiliar"
4. Whole versus part learning: "exploring component parts of an action as well as the whole"
5. Repetition and variation: "introducing novelty in learning in order to expand possibilities for choice"

== Effectiveness ==
In 2015, the Australian Government's Department of Health published the results of a review of 17 natural therapies that sought to determine which would continue being covered by health insurance; the Feldenkrais Method was one of 16 therapies for which no clear evidence of effectiveness was found. Accordingly in 2017 the Australian government identified the Feldenkrais Method as a practice that would not qualify for insurance subsidy, saying this step would "ensure taxpayer funds are expended appropriately and not directed to therapies lacking evidence".

Proponents claim that the Feldenkrais Method can benefit people with several medical conditions, including children with autism spectrum disorders, and people with multiple sclerosis. However, no studies in which participants were identified as having an autism spectrum disorder or developmental disabilities have been presented to back these claims.

There is limited evidence that workplace-based use of the Feldenkrais Method may help rehabilitate people with upper limb complaints.

A 2022 report on the effectiveness of the Feldenkrais Method by the German Institute for Quality and Efficiency in Health Care found a "hint" of benefit for people with Parkinson's disease, compared to a passive lecture program. Evidence for helping chronic low back pain was inconsistent. The report found no evidence for long-term benefit of FM, or benefit for other conditions. It concluded, "The question about the benefit of the Feldenkrais method in comparison with active strategies such as extensive physiotherapy generally remains open. Overall, little evidence is available. From an ethical perspective, the absence of evidence from RCTs is problematic for informed decision making but does not constitute evidence of an absent benefit. Only 2 small, ongoing RCTs of questionable relevance were identified, and therefore, the availability of evidence is not expected to change in the short term."

== Criticism ==
David Gorski has written that the Method bears similarities to faith healing, is like "glorified yoga", and that it "borders on quackery". Quackwatch places the Feldenkrais Method on its list of "Unnaturalistic methods".

== History ==
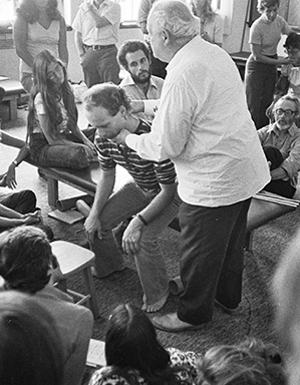
Founder Moshé Feldenkrais demonstrates Functional Integration.

From the 1950s till his death in 1984, Feldenkrais taught in his home city of Tel Aviv. He gained recognition in part through media accounts of his work with prominent individuals, including Israeli Prime Minister David Ben-Gurion. In David Kaetz's biography, Making Connections: Roots and Resonance in the Life of Moshe Feldenkrais (2007), he argues many lines of influence can be found between the Judaism of Feldenkrais's upbringing and the Feldenkrais Method – for instance, the use of paradox as a pedagogical tool.

Making Connections described Feldenkrais' approach:

Feldenkrais was critical of the appropriation of the term 'energy' to express immeasurable phenomena or to label experiences that people had trouble describing ... He was impatient when someone invoked energy in pseudoscientific 'explanations' that masked a lack of understanding. In such cases, he urged skepticism and scientific discourse. He encouraged empirical and phenomenological narratives that could lead to insights.

Beginning in the late 1950s, Feldenkrais traveled to teach in Europe and America. Several hundred people became certified Feldenkrais practitioners through trainings he held in San Francisco from 1975 to 1978 and in Amherst, Massachusetts, from 1980 to 1984. Cybernetics, also known as dynamic systems theory, continued to influence the Feldenkrais Method in the 1990s through the work of human development researcher Esther Thelen.^{:1535}

== See also ==
- Alexander technique
- Rolfing
- Yoga
- Tai chi
