= Moshé Feldenkrais =

Israeli engineer (1904–1984)

- משה פלדנקרייז
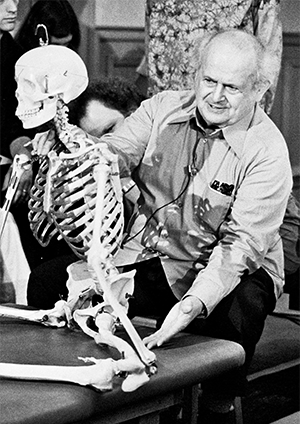
- Born: Moshé Pinchas Feldenkrais; May 6, 1904; Slavuta, Volhynia Governorate, Russian Empire
- Died: July 1, 1984 (aged 80); Tel Aviv, Israel
- Citizenship: Israel
- Known for: Founding the Feldenkrais method
- Scientific career
- Fields: Engineering, alternative medicine

Moshé Pinchas Feldenkrais (Hebrew: משה פנחס פלדנקרייז; May 6, 1904 – July 1, 1984) was an engineer and physicist, known as the founder of the Feldenkrais method.

Feldenkrais' theory is that "thought, feeling, perception and movement are closely interrelated and influence each other."

== Life ==
Moshé Pinchas Feldenkrais was born in 1904 to a Ukrainian Jewish family in the city of Slavuta in the Russian Empire (present-day Ukraine) and grew up in the city of Baranovichi (present-day Belarus), where he received his Bar Mitzvah, completed two years of high school, and received an education in the Hebrew language and Zionist philosophy. In 1918, he immigrated to the British Mandate for Palestine. He worked as a laborer and obtained his high school diploma from Gymnasia Herzliya in 1925. After graduation, he worked as a cartographer for the British survey office and began to study self-defense, including Ju-Jitsu. He suffered a soccer injury in 1929 that was aggravated during World War II, prompting him to develop his own method of healing.

During the 1930s, Feldenkrais lived in France, where he earned his engineering degree from the École Spéciale des Travaux Publics. Later he earned his Doctor of Science in Physics at the University of Paris, where Marie Curie was one of his teachers.

He worked as a research assistant to nuclear chemist and Nobel Prize laureate Frédéric Joliot-Curie at the Radium Institute. In September 1933, he met Jigoro Kano, the founder of judo in Paris. Kano encouraged him to study judo under Mikinosuke Kawaishi. Feldenkrais became a close friend of Kano and corresponded with him regularly. In 1936, he earned a black belt in judo, and later gained his 2nd degree black belt in 1938. He was a co-founding member of the Ju-Jitsu Club de France, one of the oldest Judo clubs in Europe, which still exists today. Frédéric and Irène Joliot-Curie and Bertrand Goldschmidt took Judo lessons from Feldenkrais during their time together at the institute.

On the eve of the Nazi invasion of France in 1940, Feldenkrais fled to Britain with a jar of heavy water and a sheaf of research material, with instructions to deliver them to the British Admiralty War Office. Until 1946, he was a science officer in the Admiralty working on anti-submarine weaponry in Fairlie, Scotland. His work on improving sonar led to several patents. He also taught self-defense techniques to his fellow servicemen. On slippery submarine decks, he re-aggravated an old soccer knee injury. Refusing an operation, he was prompted to intently explore and develop self-rehabilitation and awareness techniques by self-observation, which he later developed as his method. His discoveries led him to begin sharing with others (including colleague J. D. Bernal) through lectures, experimental classes, and one-on-one work with a few.

After leaving the Admiralty, Feldenkrais lived and worked in private industry in London. His self-rehabilitation enabled him to continue his judo practice. From his position on the International Judo Committee, he began to study judo scientifically, incorporating the knowledge that he had gained by self-rehabilitation. In 1949, he published the first book on his method, Body and Mature Behavior: A Study of Anxiety, Sex, Gravitation and Learning. He studied the work of Gurdjieff, F. Matthias Alexander, Elsa Gindler and William Bates. He also traveled to Switzerland to study with Heinrich Jacoby.

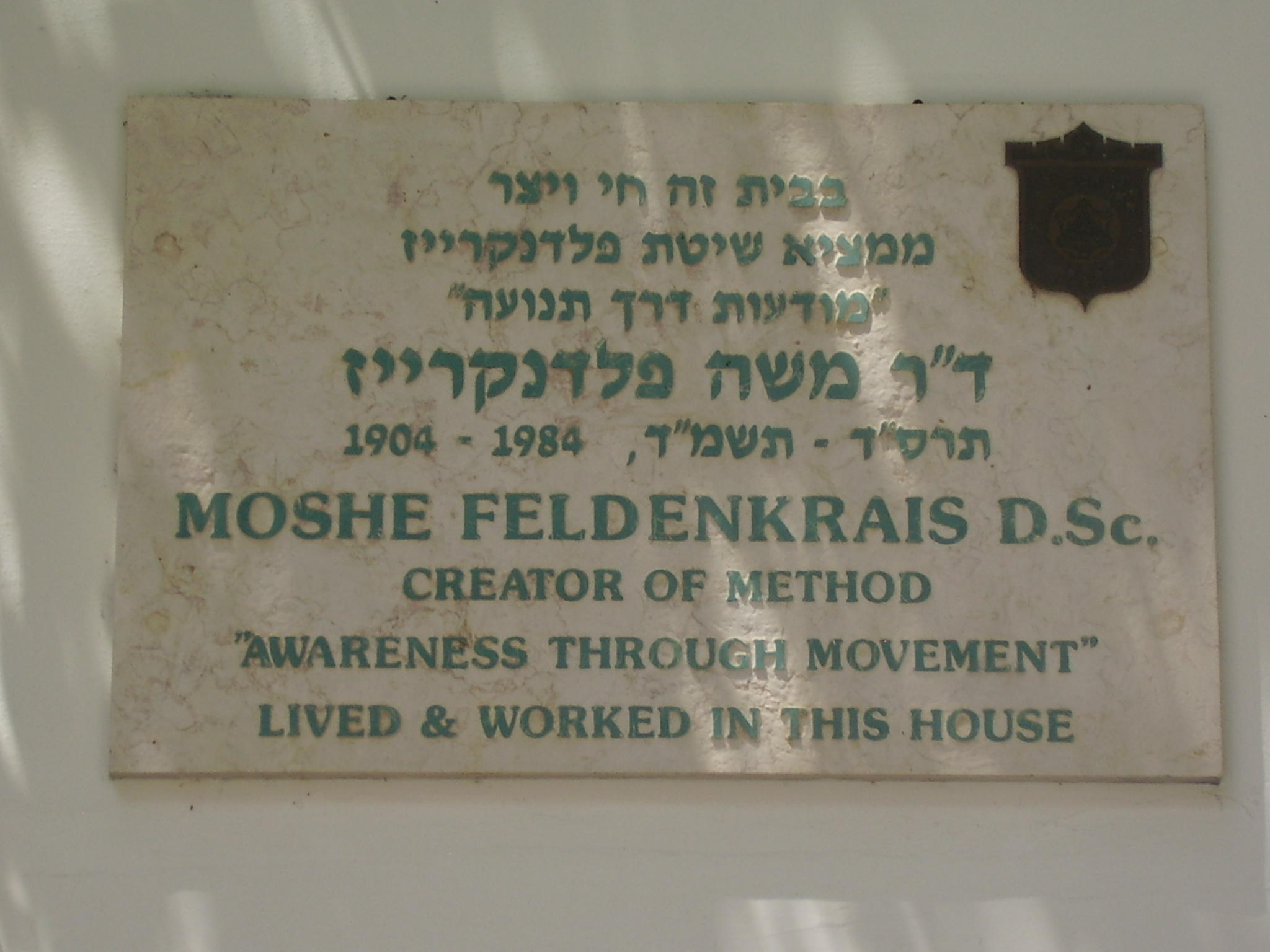
Memorial plaque in Tel Aviv

In 1951, he returned to Israel. In 1954, after directing the Israel Defense Forces (IDF) Department of Electronics for several years, he settled in Tel Aviv and began to teach his method full-time. In 1957, he met Mia Segal, who became his assistant and worked with him for thirty years. He also became the personal trainer of David Ben-Gurion, the Prime Minister of Israel, whom he taught to stand on his head in a yoga pose.

Throughout the 1960s, 1970s and in 1980 he presented his method in Europe and in North America (including an Awareness Through Movement program for human potential trainers at Esalen Institute in 1972). He trained the first group of 13 teachers in the method from 1969 to 1971 in Tel Aviv. Over the course of four summers, from 1975 to 1978, he trained 65 teachers in San Francisco at Lone Mountain College under the auspices of the Humanistic Psychology Institute. In 1980, 235 students began his summer teacher-training course at Hampshire College in Amherst, Massachusetts. After becoming ill in the fall of 1981, after teaching two of the planned four summers, he stopped teaching publicly.

== Feldenkrais Method ==
The Feldenkrais Method is intended to teach better movement and improve quality of life, by means of instruction and gentle manipulation of the body.
