= Ida Rolf =

American biochemist (1896–1979)

Ida Pauline Rolf
- Born: May 19, 1896; New York City, U.S.
- Died: March 19, 1979 (aged 82); Bryn Mawr, Pennsylvania, U.S.
- Education: Barnard College; Columbia University
- Known for: Structural Integration ("Rolfing")

Ida Pauline Rolf (May 19, 1896 – March 19, 1979) was a biochemist and the creator of the pseudoscientific practice of Structural Integration, later termed Rolfing, a type of manual therapy that claims to aligning the human body's so-called "energy field" and Earth's gravity.

== Early life ==
Rolf was born in New York City in the Bronx on May 19, 1896. She was an only child. Her father, Bernard Rolf, was a civil engineer who built docks and piers on the east coast.

Rolf graduated from Barnard College in 1916 with a bachelor's degree in chemistry. She was in the Mathematics Club, German Club, Vice President of the class of 1916, a member of the Young Women's Christian Assn., was the alternate for the Graduate Fellowship while working at the Rockefeller Foundation, Business Manager of The Barnard Bulletin, and a member of Phi Beta Kappa. She received Departmental Honours in Chemistry at graduation. In 1917 she began her doctoral studies at Columbia University and, concurrently, Rolf also began work at the Rockefeller Institute as a chemical researcher.

In 1920, Rolf earned her PhD in biological chemistry under the supervision of Phoebus Aaron Theodore Levene, of the Columbia University College of Physicians and Surgeons. Her dissertation was entitled "Three Contributions to the Chemistry of the Unsaturated Phosphatides", originally printed in three separate issues of the Journal of Biological Chemistry. It was printed in its entirety as a bound book called "Phosphatides" in late 1922. She studied yoga with Pierre Bernard which influenced her development of Rolfing.

== Career ==
After graduating, Rolf continued to work with Levene at the Rockefeller Institute for Medical Research in New York City. In 1918, she was promoted to assistant in the chemistry lab. In 1922, two years after having received her PhD from Columbia, Rolf was raised to associate, then the highest non-tenured position for a scientist at Rockefeller. From 1919 to 1927, she published 16 scholarly journal papers, mostly in the Journal of Biological Chemistry. Her research was primarily laboratory studies on biochemical compounds lecithin and cephalin. With the exception of her doctoral dissertation, all of her published work was co-authored with Levene. In 1926, Rolf left her academic work in New York to study mathematics and atomic physics at the Swiss Federal Institute of Technology in Zurich and also biochemistry at the Pasteur Institute in Paris, France.

Rolf later developed Structural Integration. Structural Integration, later known as Rolfing, is a type of manual therapy that claims to improve human biomechanical functioning. Rolf began developing her system in the 1940s. Her main goal was to organize the human bodily structure in relation to gravity. Rolf called her method "Structural Integration", now also commonly known by the trademark "Rolfing". Structural integration is a pseudoscience and its claimed benefits are not substantiated by medical evidence.

In addition to her 16 academic papers published from 1919 to 1927, she would later publish two papers in scholarly journals on Structural Integration. In the mid-1960s, she began teaching her Structural Integration method at Esalen Institute. Esalen was the epicenter of the Human Potential Movement. Rolf exchanged ideas with countercultural figures including Fritz Perls. Her publications about the therapy include:

- 1978 VERTICAL - Experiential Side to Human Potential, Journal of Humanistic Psychology
- 1973 Structural Integration - Contribution to understanding of stress, Confinia Psychiatrica
- 1979 Rolfing: Reestablishing the Natural Alignment and Structural Integration of the Human Body for Vitality and Well-Being, Healing Arts Press

In 1971, Rolf's teaching activities were consolidated under the Rolf Institute of Structural Integration. As of 2010, it had graduated 1,536 practitioners, including some trained in Germany, Brazil, Japan, and Australia, in addition to the main program in Boulder, Colorado. In 1990, a group of senior faculty split off to found the Guild of Structural Integration, which had 628 graduates as of 2010. About two dozen schools were teaching Structural Integration in 2011. Standards for the field of Structural Integration are maintained by a professional membership organization, the International Association of Structural Integration.

The documentary Ida Rolf – Mother of Fascia, directed by Aleš Urbanczik, recounts her life; the Fascia Research Society screened it at its 2025 congress in New Orleans.
