= Rolfing =

Form of alternative medicine

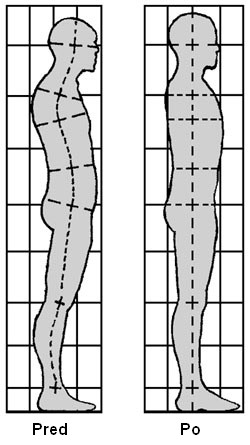
Rolfing's purported improvement of posture

Rolfing (/ˈrɔːlfɪŋ, ˈrɒl-/) is a form of alternative medicine originally developed by Ida Rolf (1896–1979) as Structural Integration. Rolfing is marketed with unproven claims of various health benefits, is recognized as pseudoscience and is generally characterized as quackery. It is based on Rolf's ideas about how the human body's "energy field" can benefit when aligned with the Earth's gravitational field.

Rolfing is typically delivered as a series of ten hands-on physical manipulation sessions sometimes called "the recipe". Practitioners combine superficial and deep manual therapy with movement prompts. The process is sometimes painful. The safety of Rolfing has not been confirmed. The principles of Rolfing contradict established medical knowledge, and there is no good evidence that Rolfing is effective for the treatment of any health condition.

== History ==
The practice of Rolfing was developed in the 1940s by Ida Rolf, who held a PhD in biological chemistry from Columbia University. Originally called Structural Integration, Rolf's method was influenced by osteopathic manipulation, yoga, postural training therapies, and the general semantics of Alfred Korzybski.

According to Jacobson, she "organized these ideas around her own conviction that the adequacy of the individual's adaptation to gravity... was a key determinant of physical and psychologic health."

Rolf began formally teaching her method in the 1950s at the European College of Osteopathy in Maidstone, England, and later at the Esalen Institute in Big Sur, California, where she worked with other figures in the Human Potential Movement.

In 1971, Rolf founded the Rolf Institute of Structural Integration in Boulder, Colorado, to formalize training in her method. By 2010, the Institute had expanded to include multiple training centers worldwide.

In 1990, a group of senior faculty founded the Guild for Structural Integration, a separate teaching organization. Today, multiple schools and professional associations offer training in Structural Integration. The International Association of Structural Integrators (IASI), founded in 2002, maintains certification standards across various schools worldwide.

As of 2025, there are more than 1,950 Rolfers worldwide.

== The field of Structural Integration ==
Since Rolf's death, the field of Structural Integration has branched into various schools. Of these schools, the Rolf Institute is the only one with the use of the trademarked terms "Rolfing" and "Certified Rolfer". Other programs of Structural Integration certify "Practitioners of the Rolf Method of Structural Integration" including the Guild for Structural Integration, Hellerwork Structural Integration, Aston Patterning, SOMA, KMI, and a dozen other Structural Integration programs. A professional membership organization exists called the International Association of Structural Integration, which has certified practitioners by exam since 2007.

In the United States, some states including New Hampshire and Nevada, have a separate license for SI. Internationally, some countries have a Board of Health that regulates bodywork while others don't. Four Canadian provinces require licensure for bodywork practitioners. Switzerland has separate licensure for complementary therapies including Structural Integration.

== Conceptual basis ==
Professor of Complementary Medicine Edzard Ernst has offered this definition: "Rolfing is a system of bodywork invented by Ida Pauline Rolf (1896–1979) employing deep manipulation of the body's soft tissue allegedly to realign and balance the body's myofascial structures." Rolfing is based on the unproven belief that such alignment results in improved movement, breathing, pain reduction, stress reduction, and emotional changes.

Rolf described the body as organized around an axis perpendicular to the earth, pulled downward by gravity, and she believed the function of the body was optimal when it was aligned with that pull. In her view, gravity tends to shorten fascia, leading to disorder of the body's arrangement around its axis and creating imbalance, inefficiency in movement, and pain. Rolfers aim to lengthen the fascia in order to restore the body's arrangement around its axis and facilitate improved movement. Rolf also discussed this in terms of "energy" and said:

Rolfers make a life study of relating bodies and their fields to the earth and its gravity field, and we so organize the body that the gravity field can reinforce the body's energy field. This is our primary concept.

The manipulation is sometimes referred to as a type of bodywork, or as a type of massage. Some osteopaths were influenced by Rolf, and some of her students became teachers of massage, including one of the founders of myofascial release.

Rolf claimed to have found an association between emotions and the soft tissue: "Rolfing is not primarily a psychotherapeutic approach to the problems of humans, but [...] many people insist on so regarding it. Rolfing is an approach to the personality through the myofascial collagen components of the physical body." She claimed Rolfing could balance the mental and emotional aspects of subjects and that "the amazing psychological changes that appeared in Rolfed individuals were completely unexpected." Rolfers suggest their manipulations can cause the release of painful repressed memories. Rolfers also hold that by manipulating the body they can bring about changes in personality; for example, teaching somebody to walk with confidence will make them a more confident person. The connection between physical structure and psychology has not been proven by scientific studies.

== Technique ==
Rolfing is typically performed in ten sessions, sometimes called "the recipe", which claim to reorganize the body's connective tissues. The first three sessions focus on superficial tissues, the next four focus on deeper tissues and specifically the pelvis, and the final sessions address the whole body. A session typically lasts between 60 and 90 minutes. The recipient wears undergarments and moves between the positions of lying on a table, sitting, and standing. Rolfing treatments can be painful and cause soreness.

== Effectiveness and reception ==
Because of its dependence on vitalistic concepts and its unevidenced propositions about the connection between physical manipulation and psychology, Rolfing is classified as a pseudoscience, and is generally seen as quackery.

Writing for Science-Based Medicine, lawyer Jann Bellamy writes that in the United States of America the public is inadequately protected from bodywork practices such as Rolfing because of the lack of independent oversight; instead certification is carried out within a "closed loop" system by such bodies as the National Certification Board for Therapeutic Massage and Bodywork.

In 2015 the Australian Government's Department of Health published a review of 17 alternative therapies, including Rolfing, which concluded no clear evidence of effectiveness was found. Accordingly, in 2017, the Australian government named Rolfing as a practice that would not qualify for insurance subsidy, to ensure the best use of insurance funds. A follow-up systematic review in 2022 confirmed there was no good evidence Rolfing has therapeutic effect and did not recommend a return to insurance subsidy.

Proponents of Rolfing claim it can be used to alleviate pain. However, Rolfing's focus on appropriate "alignment" of structures of the body does not reflect modern science about pain.

The American Cancer Society says the deep soft tissue manipulations such as those used in Rolfing are a concern if practiced on people with cancer near tumor sites.

In 2010 The New York Times reported that Rolfing was enjoying a "resurgence" following an endorsement from Mehmet Oz on The Oprah Winfrey Show.

In 2019 a taxonomy of "internet scams" identified Rolfing as having been used for deceptive claims about alleviating gastrointestinal problems by "restructuring" muscle tissue.

== See also ==
- Pierre Bernard (yogi) – an influence on Rolf
