= Jane English =

American photographer, artist, author, and physicist

- Jane English in Vermont, 2016
- Born: 1942 (age 83–84); Boston, Massachusetts
- Occupations: photographer, artist, author, and physicist
- Notable work: Lao Tsu / Tao Te Ching; Chuang Tsu / Inner Chapters
- Spouse: Gia-Fu Feng (m. 1970; died 1985)

Jane English, born 1942 in Boston, Massachusetts, is a photographer, artist, and author who holds a doctorate in particle physics and is also a licensed hot-air balloon pilot and amateur radio emergency communications volunteer. She has lived in California and Colorado, and as of 2026 resided in Vermont.

She is best known as co-creator of bestselling translations of the Tao Te Ching and the Zhuangzi Inner Chapters, featuring her photography and design accompanying translation and calligraphy by Gia-Fu Feng, in the books Lao Tsu / Tao Te Ching, first published in 1972, and Chuang Tsu / Inner Chapters, first published in 1974, which she republished in several editions including gender-neutral versions in 2011 and 2014.

English has continued to create and publish books, wall calendars, notecards, art and more. Her later publications focus on nature, consciousness, Taoism, and Indigenous traditions. Chungliang Al Huang has collaborated with her on several projects.

== Early life ==
Jane English was born in 1942 in Boston, Massachusetts, and grew up in a small New England town, in a colonial house built in 1765. Her grandfather was a professor at the Massachusetts Institute of Technology, her father was an electrical engineer, and her mother was a homemaker and avid gardener. She earned a Bachelor of Arts in Physics from Mount Holyoke College in 1964, and began pursuing photography while at the graduate school of the University of Wisconsin–Madison where she completed a Ph.D. in particle physics in 1970.

In photography she followed in the footsteps of her grandfather, Walter H. James (1873-1965), her grandmother Ida Rachel Butterfield James (1875-1966), and her great-aunt Lucy Ardena Butterfield (1871-1955). Their black-and-white photographs of New England towns, landscapes, and farm scenes were on the walls of her childhood home. Their negatives are now in the collection of the University of New Hampshire library, and with her brother Ben English, Jr., she edited a two-volume collection of their photos and journals, Our Mountain Trips, Part 1: 1899-1908, published in 2005, and Our Mountain Trips, Part 2: 1909-1926, published in 2007.

In graduate school a boyfriend introduced her to darkroom techniques at the student union, and together they exhibited their photographs and sold prints at art shows. She chose to work in black-and-white images for many years, pursuing photography as an alternative to her experiences in graduate physics departments and laboratories, where she was the only woman at the time. While in graduate school she also explored the works of Alan Watts and did an encounter group weekend, and sought answers to her questions about quantum physics and consciousness.

After completing her Ph.D. in 1970, she accepted a six-month postdoctoral appointment with the University of Wisconsin, working at the Lawrence Berkeley National Laboratory particle accelerator at the suggestion of a supportive professor who believed the Berkeley area was the right place to explore other paths. Six months later she declined an offer from Rutgers University for another postdoctoral position, preferring to stay in California and leave physics to focus on photography and further explore alternatives at the Stillpoint intentional community.

== Stillpoint ==
While working at Lawrence Lab she had been invited by her housemate to visit "a meditation place in Los Gatos". That turned out to be Stillpoint, an intentional community in the Santa Cruz Mountains where she met Gia-Fu Feng. Feng founded Stillpoint in 1966 as an unconventional Taoist meditation center and clothing-optional commune, where he led personal growth and community planning sessions using techniques based on Gestalt therapy and encounter groups.

Originally from China, Feng was the first tai chi teacher at Esalen Institute, a friend of Alan Watts, and author of a book on tai chi and the I Ching. He was 23 years her senior but, as she explained in interviews with Feng's biographer as well as in her own writing, during graduate school she had been through two live-in relationships with fellow physicists in which she felt like "an anomaly: a colleague, yet also a part of the group of girlfriends and wives", but this would be a different kind of personal and professional relationship.

Two months later, after turning down the Rutgers offer, she moved to Stillpoint with a plan to focus on her photography while also exploring all that Stillpoint had to offer. She set up a darkroom in the lower level under the deck of the main house. A relationship with Feng developed. Within the year they declared their bond in an informal outdoor ritual at Yosemite National Park, and were married by Alan Watts in an impromptu ceremony during a gathering at his home in Marin on Christmas Day 1970.

She became co-director of Stillpoint, and in January 1971 they also began their collaboration on the first of two bestselling books. Feng had decided to translate the Tao Te Ching by Laozi (Lao Tsu) for discussion at the Stillpoint daily meetings. There his drafts were contemplated and polished by English and other Stillpointers, for whom those sessions were much like an ongoing seminar in ancient Chinese philosophy, and it soon became clear this would be his next publication. That work continued as the community migrated from California to Vermont and then Colorado.

=== Lao Tsu and Chuang Tsu ===
When asked why their Lao Tsu / Tao Te Ching became so successful, Jane English replied, "It's an illustrated version. The even more ancient language of the natural world balances the words."

By May of 1971 a core group of about 15 members of the Stillpoint community had moved to Calais, Vermont, where work continued on the Tao Te Ching. On a long hike that summer, English and Feng decided to include her black-and-white nature photographs and his calligraphy of the original Chinese text with each chapter of the translation. They agreed to combine the calligraphy and photos in the style of traditional Chinese paintings, something she had envisioned long before she met him. He wrote the calligraphy directly on her photos, while she did the page design and prepared a mock-up for presentation to publishers.

They completed the book by the fall of 1971, and stopped in New York to meet with publishers while on their way to the Stillpoint community's next destination in Colorado. They were referred to editor Toinette Lippe at Alfred A. Knopf, who recognized the potential of the book and was to become a longtime collaborator. Lippe worked with Feng by mail on a detailed polishing of the translation and used English's design in production, publishing the book under the Vintage Books imprint. As the community wintered in Mineral Hot Springs, Colorado, English photographed the nearby Great Sand Dunes National Park and Preserve from which she later selected twelve photos for their next book, a translation of the Zhuangzi (Chuang Tsu) Inner Chapters.

Lao Tsu / Tao Te Ching was published in 1972 and Chuang Tsu / Inner Chapters in 1974. In New York the Willard Gallery exhibited photos and calligraphy from the first book. The national Time magazine described it as "the Tao Te Ching gussied up with photographs". Lippe later wrote "until it was 'gussied up with photographs,' the Tao Te Ching had been around for 2,500 years and Time magazine hadn't bothered to review it." Another reviewer suggested that "while the real Tao cannot be told, perhaps it can be photographed." When Chuang Tsu / Inner Chapters was released, a Canadian reviewer found the photographs "nothing short of superb – serene in composition and sensitively executed".

When they negotiated the contract for the first book, Feng initially wanted it to be under his name only, with her receiving just a one-time fee for use of the photos. English insisted on being compensated and credited equally. She later wrote that this was not an easy position for a woman to take at the time, especially given their difference in age and status, but eventually he agreed. Over one million copies of Lao Tsu / Tao Te Ching would be sold as of the twenty-fifth anniversary edition, making it the bestselling translation of that book, and Chuang Tsu / Inner Chapters would also become the bestselling translation of that book, selling more than 150,000 copies as of the release of the thirty-fifth anniversary edition.

=== Traveling teachers ===
"The farther you go, the less you know" - Lao Tsu / Tao Te Ching

Later in 1972 the Stillpoint group settled in Manitou Springs near the foot of Pike's Peak, renting until 1973 when English and Feng used their royalty advance as part of a downpayment on a large house there. The community continued in that area until 1977, when it moved to a rural area near Wetmore, Colorado.

Following the publication of the books, English and Feng received invitations to teach at two colleges. They were invited to Thomas Jefferson College in Michigan for the spring 1973 semester, and to Colorado College for two semesters in fall 1973 and spring 1974, where English taught courses on Chinese philosophy and modern physics, with Feng as guest lecturer. He also taught tai chi at Thomas Jefferson, and they led tai chi classes together at Colorado College.

Feng began leading workshops and longer retreats called "Tai Chi Camps" organized by his students around the United States, where he taught tai chi, qigong, acupressure, Chinese healing, Chinese calligraphy, and I Ching, and led group therapy sessions, often with assistance from English. Invitations from overseas multiplied as the books were translated into other languages, leading to camps in several European countries plus Australia and New Zealand. English joined Feng for part of his first trip to Europe in 1974, where they led workshops in France, Scotland, and England.

On the way there English stopped in London to meet with their British publisher, Oliver Caldecott of Wildwood House, who asked her to join him in meeting with fellow physicist Fritjof Capra and to help evaluate Capra's manuscript of The Tao of Physics, which had been turned down by twelve other publishers. English found that Capra was writing about issues that had puzzled her in graduate school and that she had explored while teaching courses on physics and Chinese philosophy, and strongly encouraged Caldecott to publish the book. It sold well in the UK, and was picked up by Shambhala Publications in the United States.

== Esalen, Fysiks, and other quests ==
=== Esalen and Green Gulch Farm ===
In the summer of 1974 Feng and English were invited to visit friends and teach for a month at Esalen Institute. At the end of that month they separated due to ongoing tensions between them, and Feng returned to Stillpoint alone. Under state common law they remained legally married. In 2020 when an interviewer asked about her "ex-husband", English explained the correct term since Feng's death in 1985 was in fact "late husband".

English stayed on at Esalen for almost a year, training in Gestalt therapy with Dick Price and tai chi with Chungliang Al Huang, as well as Rolfing, chanting, dreamwork, guided imagery, and other bodywork, mental discipline, and spiritual practices. She described it as moving on "from experimental physics to experiential study of consciousness". That same year she was also invited to speak as a physicist on the topic of "energy" at a UC Santa Cruz conference. She took it as an opportunity to look at the roots of the concept and realized "it was just that, a concept, albeit a useful concept."

In 1975 she left Esalen to participate in a nine-month Sensory Awareness training course led by Charlotte Selver at the Green Gulch Farm Zen Center. In an interview with Feng's biographer, another participant later recalled English applying her "scientifically inquiring mind" to ask Selver "hard questions others couldn't or wouldn't raise". During that time English shared a rental house in nearby Bolinas, California, where she received galley proofs of The Tao of Physics from the publisher for her review at Capra's request.

=== Atomic Reality and Fundamental Fysiks ===
In a 2020 interview English stated that, assisted by a heightened awareness due to Selver's course, while reading Capra's chapter on the discovery of quantum theory she experienced a Zen-like sudden realization upon encountering the phrase "awareness of atomic reality". In graduate school she had thrown a book by Alan Watts across the room in frustration, feeling she was missing a connection between quantum theory and consciousness, exemplified in a paradox that had disturbed her since her undergraduate studies: light is a wave in mathematics, but this is impossible to completely describe in words.

English described experiencing, for a short time that day in Bolinas, a transcendent state she had previously only glimpsed while feeling at one with the subjects of her nature photographs. She said that she experienced no separation between self and the universe, and her understanding was clear. This was similar to the state Capra himself had reported experiencing years before, which he said motivated him to write his book.

Soon thereafter she participated in a gathering of physicists at the Lawrence Berkeley lab, called the Fundamental Fysiks Group, where she contributed to discussion of the implications of modern physics, especially quantum theory, in how consciousness and energy might be related. While there she again met up with Capra, who was also participating and would soon become involved with Esalen. Gary Zukav was the group's primary connection to Esalen, and drew on the results of those meetings at Berkeley and conferences he organized at Esalen as he wrote The Dancing Wu Li Masters, published in 1979.

=== Human Potential, Cesarean Born, and more ===
From 1976 to 1978 she often stayed in Mendocino, California, where she helped John Heider and his wife Anne Heider establish the Human Potential School while continuing to pursue her photography. She had been friends with Anne since they were Girl Scouts and in private school together in Massachusetts. Before English met Gia-Fu Feng, Anne had learned tai chi from Feng at Esalen and modeled the postures for his first book, while John led encounter groups there under William Schutz.

John Heider's practice had since evolved toward a less confrontational approach he was calling "The Tao of Encounter". He detailed this evolution in two essay collections, Life on the Group Room Floor: An Introduction to Human Potential Theory in 1976 and Human Potential Papers: 1968–1997. His books The Tao of Leadership (1985) and The Tao of Daily Living (2000) recommend the Feng and English Lao Tsu / Tao Te Ching and Capra's The Tao of Physics. Anne Heider would go on to earn a doctorate at Stanford University in 1981 and became a prominent conductor and singer in Chicago, focused on the spiritual aspects of classical music.

In 1977 English went on a solitary month-long meditation and vision quest at a cabin in the Mendocino woods. In 1978 while staying with Stillpoint friends Judith Bolinger and Chris Fessenden at their San Francisco home, English lost years of work when her darkroom in Mendocino burned down. She continued with her photography and also embarked on an 11-year project that resulted in the publication of Different Doorway: Adventures of a Cesarean Born in 1985. In that book she explored the effects of cesarean birth on a person's perceptions of the world. She has continued that exploration throughout her life, giving lectures, organizing conferences, and maintaining a resource web page called Cesarean Voices.

While living in San Francisco and Berkeley, she participated in the 1979 International Transpersonal Conference, exhibiting art inspired by the topic, and studied at the California Institute of Integral Studies where she also taught a workshop in 1981 titled Explorations of Physics and Consciousness. After moving to Marin County, she co-organized the 1982 and 1983 Bay Area Tarot Symposiums, then attended the 1983 International Transpersonal Conference in Davos, Switzerland, and from there went on a personal ten-day vision quest in Basque areas of France and Spain. She frequently returned to Esalen to study shamanic practices under Michael Harner from 1983 to 1987. During that time she also founded a publishing business, Earth Heart.

== Mount Shasta ==
English moved to Mount Shasta, California, in 1987 and lived there until 2002. The Mount Shasta volcano became a focus of her photography, and selections were published from 1990 to 2011 in an annual full-color calendar titled Mount Shasta: Where Heaven and Earth Meet and a series of notecards, and in three books, Mount Shasta: Where Heaven and Earth Meet, with writer Jenny Coyle, Mount Shasta Reflections, with writer Renee Casterline, and Mount Shasta's Black Butte, with writer Bonnie Eddy.

In 1991 she also began designing and producing a Tao Calendar and notecards, featuring quotes and black-and-white photographs from Lao Tsu / Tao Te Ching and later from Chuang Tsu / Inner Chapters as well. At first she relied on halftone film purchased from the original book publisher because her negatives had burned in the 1978 fire, but as she acquired and mastered then-new desktop publishing technology she was able to digitize Feng's calligraphy and use it with new photographs as well. She continues to publish that calendar every year.

English also assumed responsibility for the continued success of those books, beginning with a text-only edition of Lao Tsu / Tao Te Ching in 1989. She and her longtime editor, Toinette Lippe, revised and refreshed the translation to reflect improved understanding of the original Classical Chinese as well as changes in the English language, and added an introduction by scholar Jacob Needleman.

The Lao Tsu / Tao Te Ching with photographs had surpassed one million copies in sales, and the publisher agreed to release a twenty-fifth anniversary edition in 1997. It featured a foreword by Lippe titled "What Constitutes a Necessary Book?", commentary by Rowena Pattee Kryder, and an introduction by Chungliang Al Huang. She could not persuade the publisher to reissue Chuang Tsu / Inner Chapters. Although more successful than other Chuang Tsu translations, it had sold far fewer copies than their Lao Tsu title and had gone out of print. However, rights to both books had reverted to her and to Feng's estate. She published a new edition of that book herself, Chuang Tsu / Inner Chapters: A Companion Volume to Tao Te Ching, with many new photos and an introduction by Chungliang Al Huang.

=== Living Tao Foundation ===
English frequently visited Chungliang Al Huang and participated in events at his Living Tao Foundation in Gold Beach, Oregon, a four-hour drive from Mount Shasta.

When she decided to include parts of Chuang Tsu / Inner Chapters in her annual calendars, which had previously featured only content from Lao Tsu / Tao Te Ching, Huang helped her divide Feng's calligraphy of that much more text-heavy tome. Working together there and long-distance over the following decades, he also helped her select additional photographs for the new Chuang Tsu edition, contributed introductions and advised on the meaning of Classical Chinese for new editions of both texts, did the narration for an audiobook version of the Chuang Tsu and wrote the foreword to her book A Rainbow of Tao.

Feng had taught her how to use I Ching yarrow stalks, and while in Gold Beach she shared this with Huang's students. English was "particularly delighted" when Huang's sister also asked to learn how to use the stalks, as she could now "give back an ancient Chinese practice to a modern Chinese woman". She began preparing and selling natural yarrow stalk sets after her next move.

=== Community ===
English was also involved in her local community. She organized a large community garden and led well-attended public star-gazing events. She set up a Native American tipi in her yard which was used by neighborhood home-schoolers. English also passed all required exams for an amateur radio license at the Extra Class level, and became president of the local ham radio association. She used her radio skills to help provide volunteer emergency communications for the local Red Cross, the California Department of Forestry, and the Siskiyou County Sheriff's Search and Rescue Team, as well as safety communications at bike races and the annual Montague Balloon Fair. She also earned a commercial hot-air balloon pilot license.

Many of those experiences inspired further photography, writing, and art projects. For example, her involvement with the Montague fair in the 1990s led to publication of photographs by her and Shery Larson of colorful balloons in the sky above the mountains, compiled by Christine Kalakuka in the Ballooning 2000 Calendar. The tipi at her home represented her continuing exploration of what she called ""indigenous concepts of Tao", some of which she described in her 1999 book Fingers Pointing to the Moon. That book also includes a statistical analysis of tarot cards, more on cesarean birth, her background in photography, her paintings, her thoughts on science and consciousness, and other areas she had explored up to that point in her life.

== Vermont ==
=== Community ===
In 2002 English moved to Calais, Vermont — where the Stillpoint community had resided for much of 1971 — because the area offered the educational resources needed for her niece. Living there also allowed her to reestablish her longtime family connection to the White Mountains of New Hampshire, where she had been hiking and skiing since the age of four, and where her brother Ben had been deeply involved with volunteer projects like the trail crew since the 1950s.

She volunteered her amateur radio skills to provide safety communications for foot and bike races up Mount Washington in the White Mountains. She also volunteered for the Vermont Radio Amateur Civil Emergency Service and as a proctor for local amateur radio licensing exams, served on the Town of Calais Emergency Management Committee, and worked with the Town of Calais to ensure radio communications coverage for all local services due to poor cellular coverage in the region.

She also volunteered at EarthWalk Vermont, its successor LetsEarthWalk.org, and similar programs "where children go to school out in the woods one day per week." Among her many other community activities, she served as an Alternate Member of the Town of Calais Development Review Board, participated in Calais Conservation Commission meetings, and exhibited her photography and other art at local museums, crafts fairs, and arts events.

=== The Tao of projects ===
In Vermont she completed several book projects begun in California, including a reprint of her 1997 Chuang Tsu: Inner Chapters, a Companion to the Tao Te Ching in 2002, and two of the books about Mount Shasta in 2003 and 2004. She then embarked on new projects, beginning with a thirty-fifth anniversary edition of the Chuang Tsu book, published in 2008 with more new photos and an introduction by Chungliang Al Huang, as well as an audiobook version narrated by Huang released in 2014.

In 2011 and 2014, English created gender-neutral Lao Tsu and Chuang Tsu editions with more new photos, after receiving assurance from Huang that the original Classical Chinese was not specifically gendered. Her longtime editor Lippe came out of retirement to help with those books. Random House published Tao Te Ching: With Over 150 Photographs by Jane English under their Vintage Books imprint, while the new Chuang Tsu: Inner Chapters, a Companion to the Tao Te Ching was published by a small press, Hay House.

During this time her annual Tao Calendar was transformed with full color photographs, and as a small sideline she began preparing and selling sets of yarrow stalks for I Ching divination, obtaining the yarrow from local fields, her own garden, and from Foster Farms Botanicals.

=== Indigenous Tao, Rainbow of Tao, and White Pines ===
English continued her exploration of "indigenous concepts of Tao", sharing what she learned with new photography, writing, and design. She wrote that "since about 1978 I have had indigenous Native-American, Eskimo and Basque friends who have taught me much and have invited me to their ceremonies."

Beginning in 2007 she trained under Greenlandic shaman, elder, and healer Angaangaq Angakkorsuaq in North America and Europe, and traveled to Greenland four times. Out of these experiences she published her Ice Wisdom Calendar for 2011 and 2012 and created a set of Ceremony Cards in 2014 to introduce "the traditional teachings of the far north," and then authored another book.

A Rainbow of Tao, published in 2018, includes a foreword by Chungliang Al Huang. It updates her autobiography, explains and illustrates her transition to color photography in Shasta and Vermont, and offers a "retrospective story" of her "journey with Tao". It introduces and discusses concepts of Tao in ancient China and in indigenous cultures around the world, as she attempts to grasp "its true nature — the fullness of all that is."

In 2021 she began to learn the Western Abenaki language. Inspired by the indigenous perspective of the natural world and the importance of the eastern white pine to the Wabanaki peoples, from 2023 to 2025 she worked on White Pines: a woman's life-long friendship with these trees and stories by other friends of white pines, featuring a foreword by author Joseph Bruchac and photographs, art, stories, and poetry by English and 23 others, published in September 2025. In 2026 she published a prequel to White Pines in booklet form, titled All My Relatives: a gift from a dream.

== Publications ==
- With Gia-Fu Feng:
- Lao Tsu / Tao Te Ching (first edition 1972)*
- Chuang Tsu / Inner Chapters (first edition 1974)*
- *Multiple printings and revised US editions. Also published in British, German, Portuguese, Russian, Greek, Finnish, and Traditional Chinese editions.
- More books:
- Different Doorway: Adventures of a Cesarean Born (1985)
- Childlessness Transformed: Stories of Alternative Parenting (1989)
- Mount Shasta: Where Heaven and Earth Meet (1995), with Jenny Coyle
- Fingers Pointing to the Moon (1999)
- Mount Shasta Reflections (2003), with Renee Casterline
- Mount Shasta's Black Butte (2004), with Bonnie Eddy
- Our Mountain Trips, Part 1: 1899–1908 (2005), with Ben English, Jr.
- Our Mountain Trips, Part 2: 1909–1926 (2007), with Ben English, Jr.
- A Rainbow of Tao (2018)
- White Pines: a woman's life-long friendship with these trees and stories by other friends of white pines (2025)
- All My Relatives: a gift from a dream (2026)
- Calendars and cards:
- Tao Calendar and notecards (1991 to present)
- Mt Shasta: Where Heaven and Earth Meet, calendar and notecards (1990–2011)
- Ballooning 2000 Calendar (2000)
- Ice Wisdom Calendar (2011–2012)
- The Ceremony Cards: A Living Introduction to the Traditional Teachings of the Far North from Greenland (2014)
- Photographic illustration for:
- Waterchild (1980), poetry by Judith Bolinger
- Accept This Gift (1983), A Gift of Peace (1986), and A Gift of Healing (1988), edited by Frances Vaughan and Roger Walsh
