= Knute Stiles =

American poet and artist (1923–2009)

Knute Stiles (1923-December 1, 2009) was a union organizer, painter, collagist, art critic, poet and entrepreneur. He was born in Minnesota, the son of the state's first female physician. He went to the St. Paul Art School, and after World War II, attended Black Mountain College in North Carolina.

== Career ==
Stiles served in Alaska in the U.S. Army during the Second World War. He returned there annually, spending summers fishing in Alaska through 1956 working salmon boats and organizing cannery workers. From 1946 to 1948, he attended Black Mountain College, near Ashville, N.C. With assistance from the G.I. Bill of Rights, he graduated from the California School of Fine Arts in 1953. From the autumn of 1953 to 1960, he co-owned and co-managed, with fellow former Black Mountain student, artist Leo Krikorian, The Place, an artists' and writers' bar and gallery in North Beach. The bar featured poetry readings and jazz, and hosted the debut showing of artist Jay DeFeo's work. It was known for its open mike, "Blabbermouth Nights." It was frequented in those years by members of the Beat Generation including Jack Kerouac, Lawrence Ferlinghetti, Richard Brautigan, Allen Ginsberg and, from the San Francisco Renaissance, Jack Spicer.

Knute taught drawing at the San Francisco Art Institute and wrote art criticism for many years in Art Forum and Art in America. He was a dedicated avant-gardist, showing at the San Francisco Museum of Modern Art and various galleries in San Francisco and New York, and owned a gallery and frame shop in the latter.

He was a member of the International Longshore and Warehouse Union in the 1960s in San Francisco, California.

He cofounded, and shepherded for decades, an intentional community in San Francisco called East-West House. Other co-founders were from the American Academy of Asian Studies, moving on because Alan Watts was leaving that school. A few years later while Joanne Kyger was living there she began training in Zen meditation with Shunryū Suzuki. Suzuki later founded the San Francisco Zen Center, where more East-West House residents trained in Zen. In addition to Asian Studies scholars and seekers like Ananda Claude Dalenberg, Gia-Fu Feng, and Dick Price, many artists and writers resided there over the years, including Kyger and her future husband Gary Snyder, Albert Saijo, Lew Welch, Tom Field, Lenore Kandel and Phillip Whalen. Jack Kerouac was briefly a guest, and many residents became characters, under pseudonyms, in his novels On the Road and Big Sur. Kerouac's biographer, Gerald Nicosia, wrote that East-West House "was no placid colony of self-contained workers," but instead, "a madhouse of Zen lunatics." East-West House was first located at 2273 California Street near Japantown, then Geary Street in "the Avenues" and finally its members purchased a Victorian home at 733 Baker Street, in the Haight-Ashbury district.

Stiles lived for several years in San Cristobal de las Casas, Mexico. He spent his last twenty active years in Bisbee, Arizona writing poetry and painting, before moving to an assisted living residence in Tucson, Arizona. He died in Tucson on December 1, 2009.
