= Endel (app) =

Generative music app

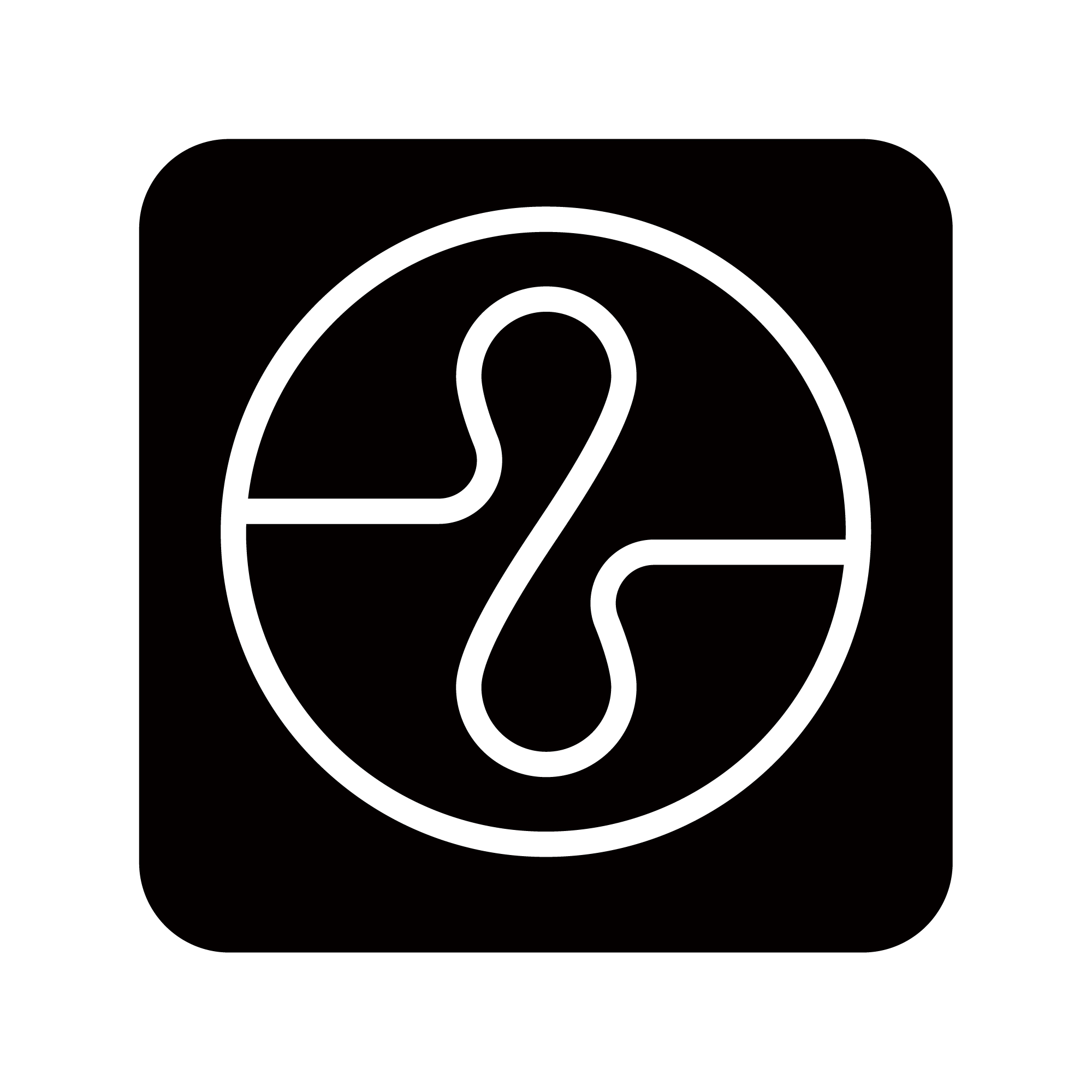
- Developer: Endel Sound GmbH
- Release: 2018; 8 years ago
- Operating system: iOS (including standalone Apple Watch), Android, Apple TV, also provided as Amazon Alexa skill
- Type: personalized sound environment app
- Website: endel.io

Endel is a paid generative AI music creation app that creates personalized sound environments (called soundscapes) to match user activities. The app provides preset modes for relaxation, focus, sleep, and moving, and reacts to time of the day, weather, heart rate and location to create unique compositions.

Endel is available on iOS and Android devices, on Apple TV, as a standalone Apple Watch app and an Amazon Alexa Skill.

== History ==
Endel was launched in 2018 as an application that generates individual soundscapes fitted to the user's immediate conditions. The app's Endel Pacific engine was built based on scientific principles about sound's effect on the human body and mind. The app is developed by a German software company Endel Sound GmbH founded by Oleg Stavitsky, Protey Temen, Philipp Petrenko, Dmitry Evgrafov, Kirill Bulatsev, and Dmitry Bezugly.

In that same year, the app completed the Techstars Music startup accelerator program and secured investments from Amazon's Alexa Fund, which focuses on voice-powered products and conversational computing. Other early investors include Warner Music Group, Sonos, Avex Group, Kima Ventures, Impulse Ventures, Plus Eight Equity Partners, Waverley Capital, Powerhouse Capital, Techstars Music, Major Lazer's Chris Leacock, and DJ La Fleur.

In September 2020 it raised a $5 million Series A funding round led by Kevin Rose and supported by existing and new investors.

== Soundscapes ==
In January 2019, Endel signed a distribution deal with Warner Music Group to produce and release 20 algorithmically created albums, attracting media attention from outlets such as Rolling Stone, Wired, The New Yorker, The Guardian, and The Wall Street Journal.

In 2020, Endel collaborated with Grimes to create AI Lullaby sleep soundscape featuring her vocals and music, inspired by her experience as a new mother. A 2022 James Blake's Wind Down album was also made in a collaboration with Endel.

Endel launched a variety of soundscapes: seasonal soundscapes like Recovery (for Winter 2020), lo-fi soundscape Study, Wiggly Wisdom soundscape with spoken word phrases from Alan Watts. The Clarity Trip soundscape, launched in October 2021, used data on user's movement and pace as a part of its generative algorithm.
