= Jean Burden =

American poet (1914–2008)

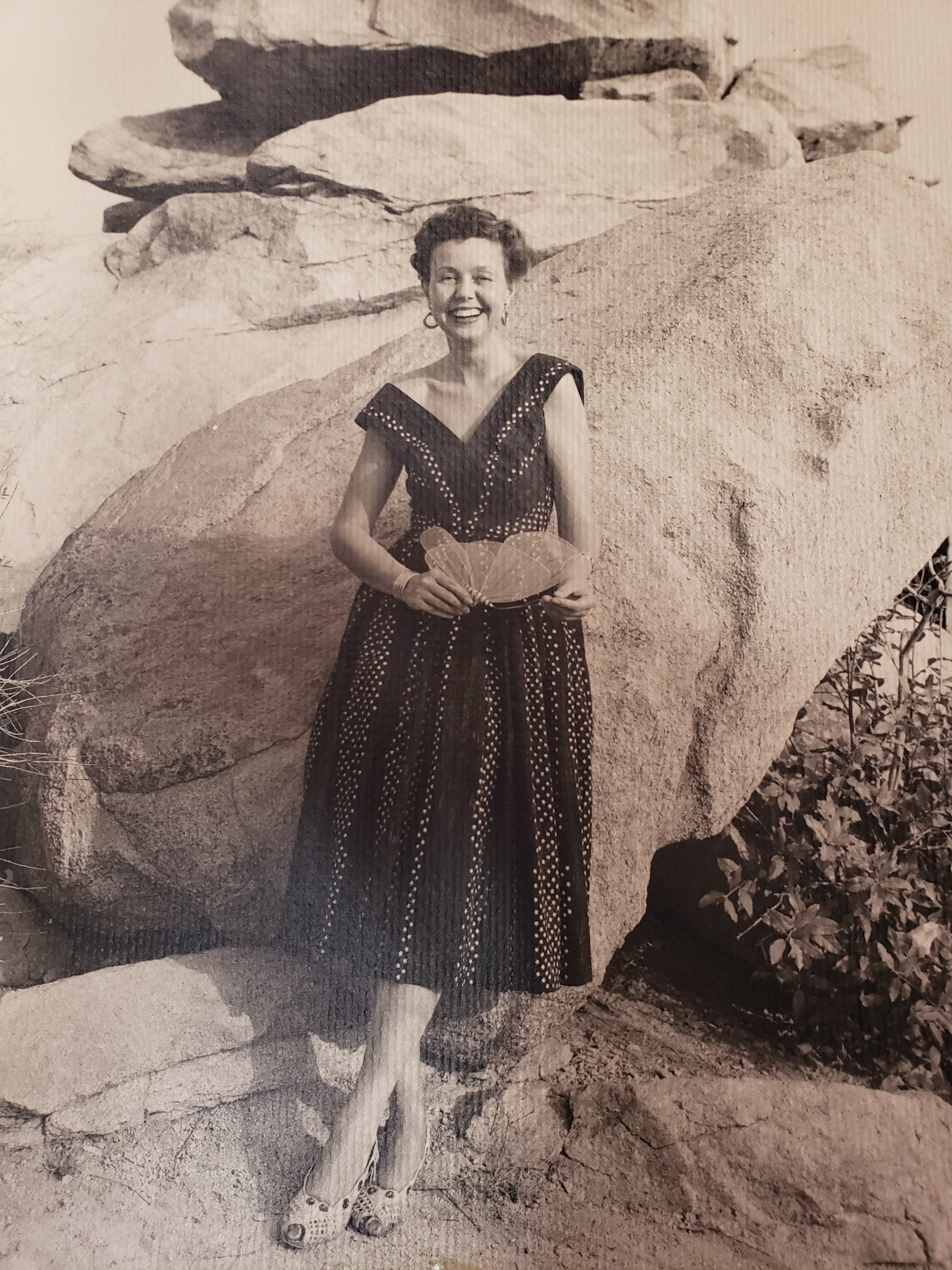
- Burden in 1963
- Born: 1 September 1914; Waukegan, Illinois
- Died: 21 April 2008 (aged 93); Altadena, California
- Education: University of Chicago
- Occupation: Poet
- Writing career
- Pen name: Felicia Ames
- Language: English

Jean P. Burden (September 1, 1914 – April 21, 2008) was an American poet, essayist, and author. She was the poetry editor for Yankee magazine for nearly fifty years. She also wrote multiple animal-care books under the pen name Felicia Ames.

== Biography ==
Born in Waukegan, Illinois, Burden was an only child. She developed an interest in poetry at age 7 which continued throughout her adult life. As a child, she adopted a small kitten which found her reading on her porch, and from that time forward she always had one or two cats. Her cats figure in some of her poetry and inspired her to write several books on cats, such as the bestseller The Classic Cat. She wrote many books on the care of animals for the Friskie Corporation, selling between two and three million copies. The first of her two books of poetry, Naked as the Glass, was praised by U.S. Poet Laureate Howard Nemerov as filled with "unobtrusive technical virtuosity".

Burden received the only two-year scholarship offered to women to attend the University of Chicago where she studied under Thornton Wilder and graduated in 1936.

== Personal life ==
Burden and her husband David were married from 1940 to 1949.

Six years after the dissolution of their marriage, Jean met Alan Watts and they had a "four year, tumultuous love affair." In describing Watts, she said, "He was a very difficult man to be in love with. He was a rogue. He drank too much. Women were catnip to him. I finally couldn’t reconcile his moral hypocrisy." And yet, she called him, "one of the most fascinating men I have ever met."

Though her affair with Watts ended badly, the union inspired Watts to call Jean in his autobiography (p. 297) an "important influence." Jean used Alan's calligraphy and a quote from him (有水皆含月 : All the waters contain the moon) in her last major work, Taking Light from Each Other.

In the 1960s and 1970s Burden had a romantic relationship with diplomat Charles W. Yost.

== Career ==
During her career she served as West Coast editor of Faith Today and for nearly 50 years (1955–2002) was the poetry editor of Yankee Magazine. She published numerous books of poetry and essays and her work appeared in many national magazines, including Poetry, Atlantic, American Scholar, Trace, Saturday Review, Virginia Quarterly Review, Better Homes and Gardens, Mademoiselle, Prairie Schooner, and Southern Review. She taught both privately and in workshops. Her book Journey Toward Poetry is a primer for teachers of poetry. She also published six books on animal welfare and pet care under the pseudonym "Felicia Ames", served as administrative officer for the Meals for Millions Foundation in Los Angeles, California, from 1956 to 1965 and did freelance public relations work.

== Honors and awards ==
Burden was a three-time MacDowell Colony fellow and was named Poet Laureate of Altadena. In 1986 California State University established the Jean Burden Annual Poetry Series to honor her for her contributions as a poet, essayist, anthologist, teacher and editor, and for her long-standing support of poetry at the university. The series features a reading by a noted poet each year and has included Pulitzer Prize winners as well as Poet Laureate from England and the United States.

== Selected publications ==
As Felicia Ames

- The Cat You Care For, 1968
- The Dog You Care For, 1968
- The Bird You Care For, 1970
- The Fish You Care For, 1971
- A Celebration of Cats, 1974
- The Classic Cats, 1975

As Jean Burden

- Naked as the Glass, 1963
- Journey Toward Poetry, 1966
- The Woman's Day Book of Hints for Cat Owners, 1980
