= Behold the Spirit =

1947 religious book by Alan Watts

- 1971 edition (publ. Pantheon Books)
- Author: Alan Watts
- Publisher: John Murray Publishers
- Publication date: 1947

Behold the Spirit: A Study in the Necessity of Mystical Religion, a book by Alan Watts (1915–1973), was first published in 1947 by John Murray Publishers (London). This book is a reworking of Watts' Episcopal divinity degree thesis. Its importance lies partly in its exposition of Watts' earliest attempt to reconcile traditional Anglican theology with a mystical, Buddhist based approach, but also as a personal expression of the mystical experience.

At the time of his appointment as the Episcopal chaplain at Northwestern University in 1944 he was said to be "wildly popular on campus, and his books were received in progressive religious circles as challenging and compelling." This book is the most extensive example of his early effort to find a non-dualistic interpretation of Anglican theology in terms of The Perennial Philosophy as expounded in Aldous Huxley's 1945 book of that name and later made popular in the talks of Joseph Campbell.
