= The Way of Zen =

1957 book by Alan Watts

- First edition
- Author: Alan Watts
- Language: English
- Subject: Zen Buddhism, Philosophy, Mahayana Buddhism
- Genre: Non-fiction
- Published: 1957
- Publisher: Vintage Books
- Publication place: United States
- Media type: Print
- ISBN: 978-0375705106

The Way of Zen is a 1957 non-fiction book on Zen Buddhism and Eastern philosophy by philosopher and religious scholar Alan Watts. It was a bestseller and played a major role in introducing Buddhism to a mostly young, Western audience.

== Content ==
The Way of Zen is divided into two sections, the first which deals with the background and historical development of Zen Buddhism, and the latter which focuses on the principles and practices. The second half has sections that include "Empty and Marvelous," "Sitting Quietly, Doing Nothing," "Za-zen and the Koan," and "Zen and the Arts."

Watts traces the origin of Zen Buddhism as a synthesis of Chinese Taoism and Mahayana Buddhism. Watts introduces the reader to a variety of Eastern philosophical concepts such as wuwei, Middle Way and anatman. Watts portrays the Western philosophical tradition as being intrinsically limited by the strict adherence to logical structures as opposed to Eastern philosophy which is not bound by these structures.
