= Tao: The Watercourse Way =

1975 book by Alan Watts

- First edition
- Author: Alan Watts, Al Chung-liang Huang (collaborator)
- Language: English
- Subject: Taoism, philosophy
- Genre: Non-fiction
- Published: 1975, Pantheon
- Publication place: United States
- Media type: Print
- Pages: 134 pages
- ISBN: 0394733118

Tao: The Watercourse Way is a 1975 non-fiction book on Taoism and philosophy, and is Alan Watts' last book. It was published posthumously in 1975 with the collaboration of Al Chung-liang Huang, who also contributed a preface and afterword, and with additional calligraphy by Lee Chih-chang.

== Synopsis ==
This short book (five chapters, with a Preface, Bibliography, etc.) provides a distillation of Watts' view of Taoism accompanied by historical information. Linguistic issues are highlighted and calligraphic samples of many of the cited Chinese texts are included. As described in Huang's Preface, Watts had planned two further chapters showing how Taoism could be "medicine for the ills of the West", but these were unwritten at the time of Watts' death in 1973.

== Reception ==
Kirkus Reviews praised the work, and stated that it was a "Good introduction to the Tao." Joseph Needham also wrote favorably of Tao: The Watercourse Way and called it an "admirable introduction to Taoist philosophy and its symbolism".
