= Protey Temen =

Russian artist

- Born: March 26, 1984 (age 42)

Protey Temen (born March 26, 1984, Moscow) is a contemporary artist, a multi-disciplinary media-artist whose works are often performed in the form of total installations, including graphics, video-art, sculpture, and painting. He is a teacher at the Design School of the National research university the Higher School of Economics.

== Career ==
Born in Moscow (in the Tushino district), into a family of biological scientists, which is where he picked up his first impressions of the visual structure of scientific knowledge. He became interested in drawing and graphic design as early as his school days, and upon leaving he began work as the art director of KULT, a Moscow music club. He trained as an art director at the Humanitarian Institute of Television and Radio Broadcasting (2001-2002), and at the International Advertisement Institute (2003-2006). In 2003 he became a member of the Zunge Design studio in Moscow, where he later became an art director. In 2006 he became a member of The Tsekh (The Guild) world illustrators association.

Since 2009, Protey focused on multi-media art, working, in the fields of generative video, installation and performance which were new to him, in parallel with classical art practices. In 2009 Temen, together with the artist Dima Kavko, founded the Gruppa Krovi art-association. Since 2011 he has been a member of the Moscow Union of Artists, a participant in the “Partnership of Placard Makers”, regional public organization. In 2012 he graduated from the Institute of Contemporary Art, from a course in “New Artistic Strategies”. At the same time, together with other ICA graduates, he created an art group named GZKRKP (Glazun, Zhuravlev, Kiryusha, Ryumin, Kavko, Protey) and took part in group exhibitions as a member thereof.

His first solo museum exhibition took place in 2014 in the Moscow Museum of Modern Art in Petrovka Street. As part of the process of forming his own aesthetic system and artistic language, in 2013 Protey began working with Oleg Stavitsky, a game developer, to create a series of mobile art applications, Bubl, which develop children’s fundamental habit patterns. When developing interactive games designed for children aged from 1 to 6, Protey, as art director, was concerned with the development of perception of shape, colour and sound. In a year, Fox & Sheep, a German mobile application publisher, announced their acquisition of Bubl Studio

At present, Protey Temen is a regular participant in art expositions, professional discussions and multi-format festivals in Australia, Brazil, South Korea, Russia, USA, Great Britain and continental Europe. Temen defines his current art practice using two key terms: “abstract identity” and “routine spectacularity”.

“The body and the spirit, the artificial and the natural, the real and the abstract. Collision, as well as impact, results in a spark. A dialogue between these poles builds up on its own, like flesh is built up on a carcass. Models and rules observed in the world around us, borrowed and torn from their context, will serve as this carcass. To intensify attention on each particular subject, it seems appropriate to use the language of abstraction – flexible, vibrating and impregnating new senses from the context. As a result, artifacts of events will occur. A chronicle which documents itself”.

Works by Protey Temen are held by the collections of the Moscow Museum of Modern Art, the Russian State Library, Komnata (The Room) gallery, and in private collections in Russia, Germany, France and Spain. He was a participant in the Venice Biennial 2011 (Internet pavilion), the European Biennial of Modern Art Manifesta 10, and the international biennial of digital art The Wrong.

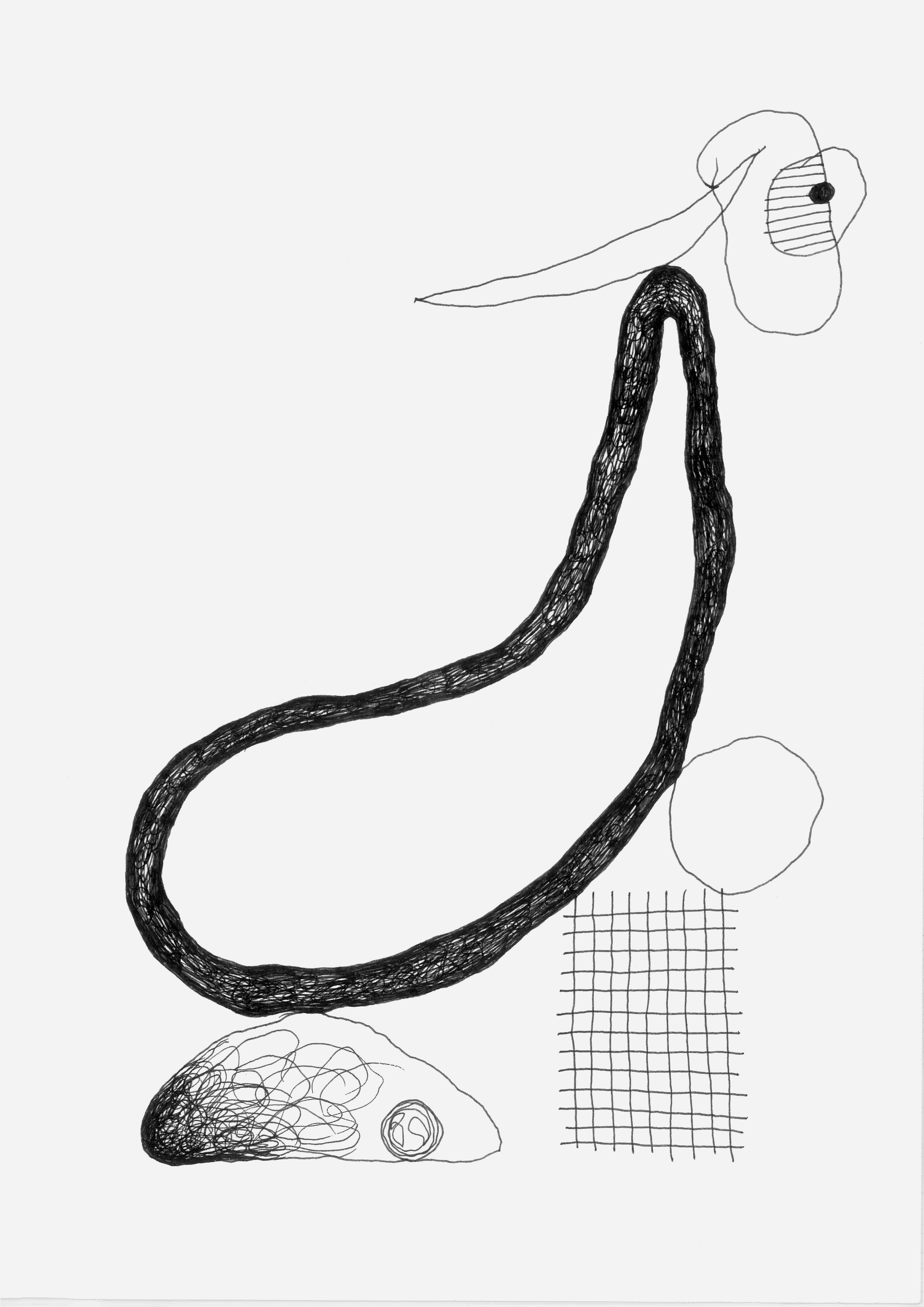
Protey Temen graphics "Stones, Hairs", 2016

== Works ==
The artist describes the surrounding world with the language of abstract graphics. Since his early childhood, Protey has developed a particular, well-recognized style which he has realized in his work both as an art director or illustrator, and in his strictly personal work.

=== Dobrotarism ===
The movement of Dobrotarism appeared in 2007, founded on the basis of the simplification of an image on a geometrical level, bright, contrasting colours and ostentatious joy. The basic goal of the artist during this period was the study of the models and structures of daily life. This resulted in the exhibition “Iconography of Dobrotarism”, held in the “Dom” (The House) cultural centre in 2007. From 2008 to 2009, within his “Post-Dobrotarism” cycle, Protey delved even deeper into abstract imaging, still remaining within the confines of his initial graphic language. “My work is about ritual, about the soul, about a kind of pure thing. And a number of symbols which I constantly used — masks, images, costumes — they are also about this pure thing. A text and an emotional experience would stand behind each picture. I came to this realisation just a short time ago, but it was true earlier too. That same Dobrotarism is mixed up in religion, in the basics of Russian icon-painting. In fact, I became drawn into the idea of identity. And what does identity mean? It is a system of signs and symbols”.

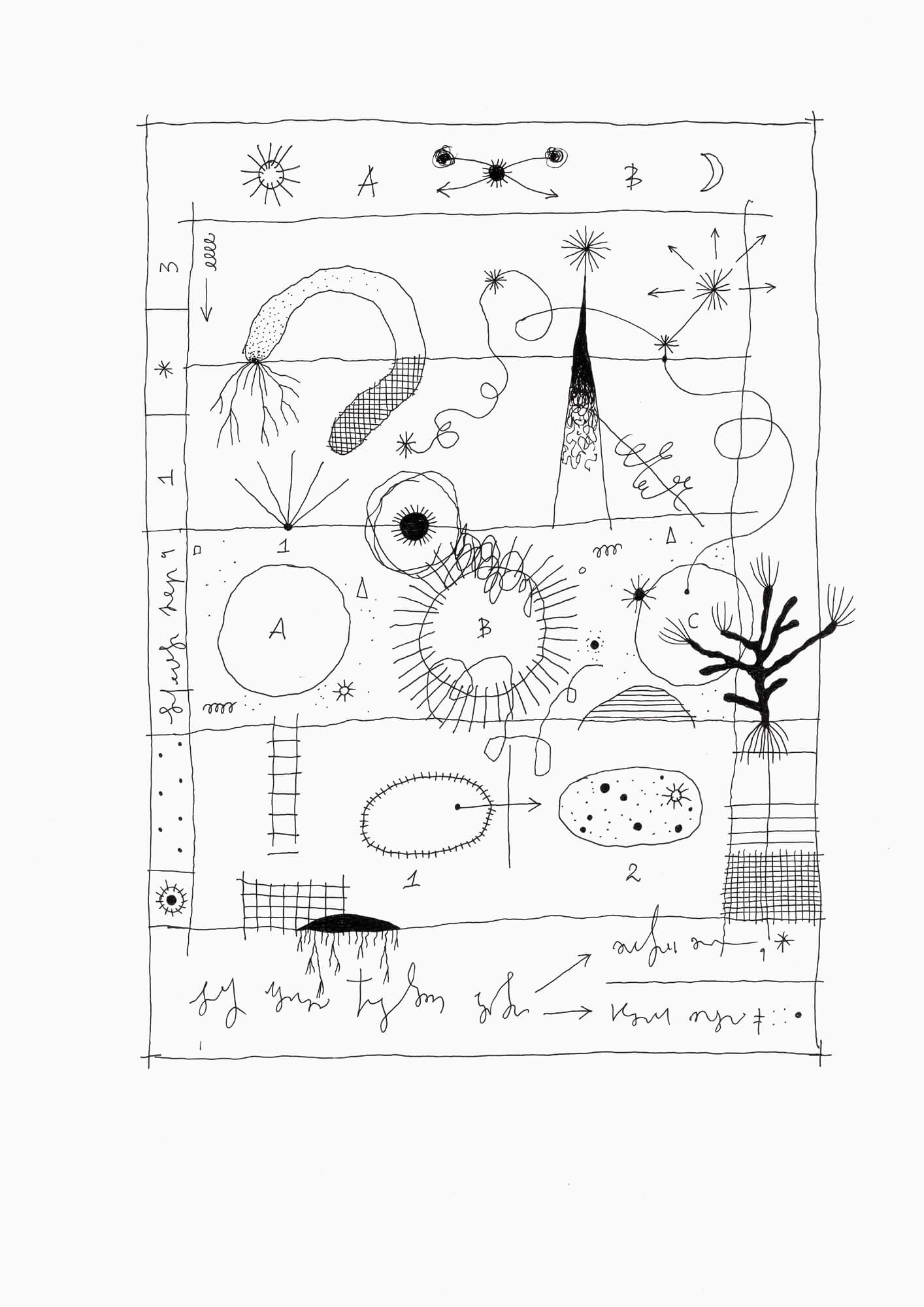
Sheet from the series "Atlas. The first part ", ink, watercolor paper, 30x42 cm.

=== The monochrome cycle ===
In 2010 the monochrome period of his work began, which featured a break from the full colour palette, beginning to describe the surrounding world via independent abstract systems. By 2013 the final abandonment of colour and semi-tones occurred. The approach that arose was also applied by Protey to alternative media: to sculpture, to video-shots, to 3D monochrome textures. The basic theme of the period was the study of an object as a body, a line, a black spot: “The spot was one of the basic images which I used earlier; and even now it attracts me for many reasons: in one case it can disguise extra items in an image, concealing their essence; in another case it becomes a silhouette and almost a sign, it is both the shadow of a man and a hole in the universe”.

=== Surritualism ===
In 2014, Protey formulated Surritualism as a new method. It is based on two inseparable parts: ritual, and the principle of surrealism to denude the absurdity of this or that action. In 2015 Temen decided not to use computer technologies in his works. His basic focus in 2016 was the representation of information and the practice of visual communication. Many images were inspired by book graphics inside scientific literature, including texts devoted to biology. The artist elaborated a system of image analysis based on a toolkit of frequently used representation models. Works of 2015-2016 are the beginning of the Inner School of Open Studies. These works unite images representing “knowledge”, using popular educational guides, explanations on table-napkins and other presentational practices of exact and sensory sciences. “Via the plastic multiplication of these layers, Protey Temen fixes such routine processes as consideration, memory and thinking”.

=== Inner School of Open Studies ===
In 2017 Protey opened the Inner School of Open Studies, where he is both a teacher and a student. He is creating a series of textbooks and atlases within his school and gives lectures, in particular, the spring cycle of lectures at ММОМА.

“The core theme Protey Temen is now working with — that is, researching the environment, analyzing it and fixing it with the plastic language of abstract art and graphics — has remained unchanged for many years, yet the artist’s aesthetics have obviously changed. From the pagan territory of myth and the method of surritualism developed by him, Protey approaches, step by step, a quasi-scientific way of interpreting the world. How does the gaze work, what is information, what are objects made of, why do we see a spot and perceive a symbol in a definite way, how do we influence what is occurring around us, acting as witnesses to various processes? Everything that can be conventionally laid into the sphere of sensory, reflexive personal experience, facts that cannot be checked, are codified and converted into common, popular knowledge by Protey. Gradually proving his hypotheses, he explains his own intuitive discoveries about the structure of the world, using the approach and vocabulary of a rationalist scientist. Nevertheless, the artist remains within the field of art: packing these pieces of knowledge into customary formats used by enlightenment institutions (texts, illustrative materials, graphs, visual aids) he returns the aesthetic focus to theory’s dry language. The scientific style of learning about reality usually implies the abandonment of the aesthetic component in favour of understanding the meaning of something. Protey combines the emotional experience of “the beautiful” and the search for “the truth”, unites the abstract and the concrete, manifests to us as spectators and students of his “inner school” the similarity between the fundamental strategies of the scientific approach and art practices aimed at the revelation of the only true and faithful version of reality”. — Julya Yousma

== Selected solo exhibitions ==
2017
Exhibition in the Apartment #68, Kotelnicheskaya Embankment Building, Moscow, Russia
Having Coffee, Making Calculations, First Person exhibition / Magazijn, Amsterdam Art Weekend, Amsterdam, Netherlands
Knowledge Of (with Lucas Gutierrez), Aperto Raum, Berlin, Germany
Processes and interactions, Музей Арт4, Москва
2016
One Ant Climbed Into Astronaut’s Ear, Moscow Architectural Institute, Moscow, Russia
2015
Untitled Corridor (with Vadim Gershman), Lazy Susan Gallery, New York, USA
2014
The Gift, Komnata Gallery, Moscow, Russia
Live Collective Art Project, Summer Music Program, Garage Museum of Contemporary Art, Moscow, Russia
The Cave of Generosity, Komnata Gallery, MMOMA, Moscow, Russia
2013
Wall, Poster Stars, New Holland, St. Petersburg, Russia
Don’t Cross the Line when Dancing on the Seashore, Emzin, NLB Gallery Avla, Lyublyana, Slovenia
2012
Video Texture, Textura Festival, Scene Molot, Perm, Russia
Fragile and About Music, Exhibition, “Manhattan” Business Center, Ekaterinburg, Russia
Soon Wave, Opening, Polyteatr by Eduard Boyakov, Moscow, Russia
Screensaver, Stoned Boys, Solyanka Club, Moscow, Russia
I am Eating when Bored, Gruppa Krovi, 180m² Gallery, Moscow, Russia
2011
Every Day Is The Same, Exhibition, Demetra Art Hotel, St. Petersburg, Russia
Passion the Movie, Rojo Nova, Cinemateka de Brasiliera, Sao Paulo, Brazil
Mechanics Logotype, Media Pole, Gallery LVS, Seoul, Korea
2010
Oil Project, Gruppa Krovi, Annexe Gallery, Bordeaux, France
Dollars & Rozes, Gruppa Krovi, Permian Economic Forum, Perm, Russia
Easter Egg, Easter, Street, St. Petersburg, Russia
2009
New Year Action, Gruppa Krovi, Tretyakovskaya metro, Moscow, Russia
Dollars & Rozes, Gruppa Krovi, Expo Center and Streets, Novosibirsk, Russia
Last Show, Gruppa Krovi, Flacon Design Factory, Moscow, Russia
Dollars & Rozes, Gruppa Krovi, Winzavod, Moscow, Russia
Shaders, Exhibition, Open Studio, Berlin, Germany
Breakfast Heroes, Pictopia, Open Studio, Berlin, Germany
2008
Advertisement Magazine, Un Sedicesimo Magazine, Edizioni Corraini, Mantova, Italy
Ovaloromb, Videoperformance, Solyanka Club, Moscow, Russia
2007
Dobrotarism Icons, Exhibition, Dom Club, Moscow, Russia

== Selected group exhibitions ==
Knowledge Of, Chapter B, The Quickest Via pavilion, The Wrong biennale, World Wide Web, 2017

Processes and Interactions, Art4 Museum, Moscow, Russia, 2016–2017

Various Works Selection, META – The Wrong New Digital Art Biennale, 180 Creative Camp, Abrantes, Portugal, 2014

Newspaper, L’École européenne supérieure d’art de Bretagne, Rennes, France, 2013

Passion the Movie. New Cut, Nova Festival, Auditório MIS, Sao Paulo, Brasil, 2012

Videomix, Gogbot Festival, Planetart, Enschede, Netherlands, 2011

Videosculptures, La Biennale di Venezia, Internet Pavilion, BYOB, Venice, Italy, 2011

== Teaching activity, talks and workshops ==
Since 2013 — curator of the educational programme in HSE Art And Design School, Contemporary art and design programme

2017 — “Spring Cycle” of Inner School of Open Studies, Moscow Museum of Modern Art, Moscow, Russia

2016 — Quality and Meaning of Natural and Digital Surfaces, Skolkovo, Russia

2016 — Точки зрения, Avantgard and Design, Tretyakov State Gallery, Moscow, Russia

2016 — Tsarapina of the Sound, Once Ant Climbed Into Astronaut’s Ear, Moscow Architectural Institute, Moscow, Russia

2014 — Surritualism in Everyday Life, Doma Art Fest, RCIC, Grand Hall, Sofia, Bulgaria

2013 — When Will Shepherd Return?, Showcase, National Center for Contemporary Art, Moscow, Russia

2012 — Comments For The Spots, Workshop, Make It, St. Petersburg, Russia

2011 — 150.000.000$ by Gruppa Krovi, Gruppa Krovi, 35mm Theatre, Moscow, Russia

2011 — Abstract Characters, Winter Intensive, British Higher School of Art & Design, Moscow, Russia

2010 — Abstract Identity Workshop, Edutainment, Business Center, Kiev, Ukraine

2009 — The Good, The Bad, The Evil, Masterskaya 20’09, Moscow Museum of Modern Art, Moscow, Russia

2009 — Constructivism Meets Character, Pictopia, Haus der Kulturen der Welt, Berlin, Germany
