= Chungliang Al Huang =

Taiwanese philosopher, dancer, and tai chi teacher

Chungliang “Al” Huang (Chinese: 黃忠良) is a Taiwanese philosopher, dancer, performing artist, tai chi master and educator. He is the founder-president of the Living Tao Foundation in Oregon, US, and the International Lan Ting Institute, in China.

== Biography ==
Huang was born in Shanghai in the 1930s. His family moved to Taiwan at the end of the Chinese civil war. He moved to the United States in the 1960s to study architecture, cultural anthropology, and choreography.

== Awards and recognition ==
- Fellow: World Academy of Art and Science, Stockholm, Sweden

== Publications ==
- Embrace Tiger Return to Mountain: The Essence of Taiji in co-operation with John O. "Steve" Stevens (now: Steve Andreas), with a preface by Stevens and his mother Barry Stevens (Real People Press, 1973)
- Tao: The Watercourse Way with Alan Watts (1975) ISBN 0-394-73311-8
- Living Tao: Still visions and dancing brushes(1976)
- Quantum Soup: A Philosophical Entertainment (1983)
- Thinking Body, Dancing Mind: Taosports for Extraordinary Performance in Athletics, Business, and Life with Jerry Lynch (1994)
- Beginner's Tai Ji Book (1995)
- Mentoring: The Tao of Giving and Receiving Wisdom with Jerry Lynch (1995)
- Chuang Tsu: Inner Chapters with Gia-Fu Feng (1997)
- Working Out, Working Within with Jerry Lynch a (1998)
- The Chinese Book of Animal Powers(1999)
- Tao Mentoring: Cultivate Collaborative Relationships in All Areas of Your Life with Jerry Lynch, and Laura Archera Huxley (1999)
- The Sage's Tao Te Ching: Ancient Advice for the Second Half of Life with William Martin, Hank Tusinski(2000)
- Essential Tai Ji (2004)
- The Way of the Champion: Lessons from Sun Tzu's The art of War and other Tao Wisdom for Sports & life with Jerry Lynch Ph.D. (2006)
- My Journey in Mystic China: Old Pu's Travel Diary by John Blofeld, with Daniel Reid, and Chungliang Al Huang (2008)
- The Spirit of Dancing Warriors with Jerry Lynch Ph.D (2010)
- Coaching With Heart: Taoist Wisdom to Inspire, Empower, and Lead with Jerry Lynch Ph.D (2013)

== Music publications ==
- The Tao of Poetry with David Darling (2007)
- The Zen of Poetry with David Darling and guest narration by Ram Dass (2009)
