= Alan Watts =

British and American writer and lecturer (1915–1973)

- Born: Alan Wilson Watts; 6 January 1915; Chislehurst, Kent, England
- Died: 16 November 1973 (aged 58); Marin County, California, U.S.
- Spouses: Eleanor Everett (m. 1938; ann. 1949); Dorothy DeWitt (m. 1950; div. 1963); Mary Jane Yates King (m. 1964)
- Children: 7

Education
- Education: Seabury-Western Theological Seminary

Philosophical work
- Era: 20th-century philosophy
- Institutions: The King's School Canterbury; American Academy of Asian Studies; Society for Comparative Philosophy; San Jose State University
- Main interests: Comparative religion
- Notable works: The Way of Zen (1957)
- Website: alanwatts.org

Alan Wilson Watts (6 January 1915 – 16 November 1973) was a British and American writer, speaker, and "philosophical entertainer", known for interpreting and popularising Buddhist, Taoist, and Hindu philosophy for a Western audience.

Watts gained a following while working as a volunteer programmer at the KPFA radio station in Berkeley, California. He wrote more than 25 books and articles on religion and philosophy, introducing the Beat Generation and the emerging counterculture to The Way of Zen (1957), one of the first best-selling books on Buddhism. In Psychotherapy East and West (1961), he argued that psychotherapy could become the West's way of liberation if it discarded dualism. He considered Nature, Man and Woman (1958) to be his best work. He also explored human consciousness and psychedelics in works such as The New Alchemy (1958) and The Joyous Cosmology (1962).

After his death, his lectures remained popular with regular broadcasts on public radio, especially in California and New York, and found new audiences with the rise of the internet.

== Early years ==
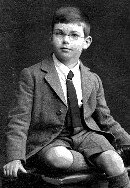
Watts aged 7

Watts was born to middle-class parents in Chislehurst, Kent on 6 January 1915, living at Rowan Tree Cottage, 3 (now 5) Holbrook Lane. Watts's father, Laurence Wilson Watts, was a representative for the London office of the Michelin tyre company. His mother, Emily Mary Watts (née Buchan), was a housewife whose father had been a missionary. With little money, they chose to live in the countryside, and Watts, an only child, learned the names of wild flowers and butterflies. Probably because of the influence of his mother's religious family, Watts became interested in spirituality. Watts was interested in storybook fables and romantic tales of the mysterious Far East. He attended The King's School Canterbury where he was a contemporary and friend of Patrick Leigh Fermor.

Watts later wrote of a mystical dream he experienced while ill with a fever as a child. During this time he was influenced by Far Eastern landscape paintings and embroideries that had been given to his mother by missionaries returning from China. The few Chinese paintings Watts was able to see in England riveted him, and he wrote "I was aesthetically fascinated with a certain clarity, transparency, and spaciousness in Chinese and Japanese art. It seemed to float ..."

=== Buddhism ===
By his own assessment, Watts was imaginative, headstrong, and talkative. He was sent to boarding schools (which included both academic and religious training of the "Muscular Christian" sort) from early years. Of this religious training, he remarked "Throughout my schooling, my religious indoctrination was grim and maudlin."

Watts spent several holidays in France in his teen years, accompanied by Francis Croshaw, a wealthy Epicurean with strong interests in both Buddhism and exotic, little-known aspects of European culture. Watts felt forced to decide between the Anglican Christianity he had been exposed to and the Buddhism he had read about in various libraries, including Croshaw's. He chose Buddhism, and sought membership in the London Buddhist Lodge, which was then run by the barrister and QC Christmas Humphreys (who later became a judge at the Old Bailey). Watts became the organization's secretary at 16 (1931). The young Watts explored several styles of meditation during these years.

=== Education ===
Watts won a scholarship to The King's School, Canterbury, the oldest boarding school in the country. Though he was frequently at the top of his classes scholastically and was given responsibilities at school, he botched an opportunity for a scholarship to Trinity College, Oxford by styling a crucial examination essay in a way that he said was read as "presumptuous and capricious".

When he left King's, Watts worked in a printing house and later a bank. He spent his spare time involved with the Buddhist Lodge and also under the tutelage of a "rascal guru", Dimitrije Mitrinović, who was influenced by Peter Demianovich Ouspensky, G. I. Gurdjieff, and the psychoanalytical schools of Freud, Jung and Adler. Watts also read widely in philosophy, history, psychology, psychiatry, and Eastern wisdom.

By his own reckoning, and also by that of his biographer Monica Furlong, Watts was primarily an autodidact. His involvement with the Buddhist Lodge in London gave Watts opportunities for personal growth. Through Humphreys, he contacted spiritual authors, e.g. the artist, scholar, and mystic Nicholas Roerich, Sarvepalli Radhakrishnan, and prominent theosophists like Alice Bailey.

In 1936, aged 21, he attended the World Congress of Faiths at the University of London, where he met the scholar of Zen Buddhism, D. T. Suzuki, who was presenting a paper. Beyond attending discussions, Watts studied the available scholarly literature, learning the fundamental concepts and terminology of Indian and East Asian philosophy.

=== Influences and first publication ===
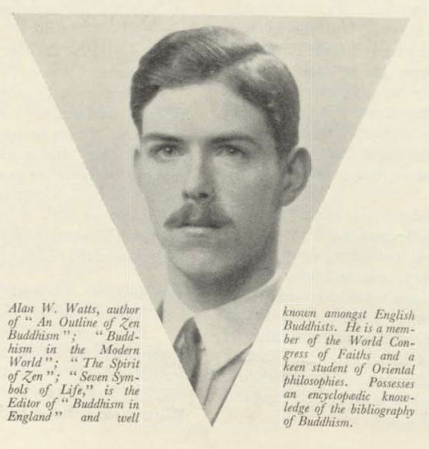
Watts in 1937

Watts's fascination with the Zen (Ch'an) tradition—beginning during the 1930s—developed because that tradition embodied the spiritual, interwoven with the practical, as exemplified in the subtitle of his Spirit of Zen: A Way of Life, Work, and Art in the Far East. "Work", "life", and "art" were not demoted due to a spiritual focus. In his writing, he referred to it as "the great Ch'an (emerging as Zen in Japan) synthesis of Taoism, Confucianism and Buddhism after AD 700 in China." Watts published his first book, The Spirit of Zen, in 1936. Two decades later, in The Way of Zen he disparaged The Spirit of Zen as a "popularisation of Suzuki's earlier works, and besides being very unscholarly it is in many respects out of date and misleading."

Watts married Eleanor Everett, whose mother Ruth Fuller Everett was involved with a traditional Zen Buddhist circle in New York. Ruth Fuller later married the Zen master (or "roshi"), Sokei-an Sasaki, who served as a sort of model and mentor to Watts, though he chose not to enter into a formal Zen training relationship with Sasaki. During these years, according to his later writings, Watts had another mystical experience while on a walk with his wife. In 1938 they left England to live in the United States. Watts became a United States citizen in 1943.

=== Christian priest and afterwards ===
Watts left formal Zen training in New York because the method of the teacher did not suit him. He was not ordained as a Zen monk, but he felt a need to find a vocational outlet for his philosophical inclinations. He entered Seabury-Western Theological Seminary, an Episcopal (Anglican) school in Evanston, Illinois, where he studied Christian scriptures, theology, and church history. He attempted to work out a blend of contemporary Christian worship, mystical Christianity, and Asian philosophy.

Watts was ordained an Episcopalian priest on Ascension Day 1945, which he justified by writing it was the only occupation in which he could "begin to fit". He struggled to find Christian authority for his Buddhist beliefs, resulting in his 1947 book Behold the Spirit: A Study in the Necessity of Mystical Religion which resulted in him being awarded a master's degree in theology.(The book of letters by Watts's daughters indicates that he was ordained in 1944, not 1945, and evidence for this is much better than what he writes in his autobiography.)

Watts believed that marriage did not fit his non-monogamous nature. As this became increasingly manifest, his wife Eleanor sued for annulment on grounds that Watts "contracted a monogamous marriage under false pretenses". Watts responded to his Bishop's "letter of inquiry" about the matter with a letter of resignation as a priest in August 1950.

Watts later published Myth & Ritual in Christianity (1953), an eisegesis of Christian traditions that made use of his knowledge of Asian philosophy and religion to provide insight into medieval Roman Catholic mythology, mysticism, and ritual, which he lamented had provided meaning that had been lost in the development of modern Christian practices.

In early 1951, Watts moved to California, where he joined the faculty of the American Academy of Asian Studies in San Francisco. Here he taught from 1951 to 1957 alongside Saburo Hasegawa (1906–1957), Frederic Spiegelberg, Haridas Chaudhuri, lama Tada Tōkan (1890–1967), and various visiting experts and professors. Hasegawa taught Watts about Japanese customs, arts, primitivism, and perceptions of nature. During this time he met the poet Jean Burden, with whom he had a four-year love affair.

Watts credited Burden as an "important influence" in his life and gave her a dedicatory cryptograph in his book Nature, Man and Woman, mentioned in his autobiography (p. 297). Besides teaching, Watts was for several years the academy's administrator. One student of his was Eugene Rose, who later went on to become a noted Eastern Orthodox Christian hieromonk and controversial theologian within the Orthodox Church in America under the jurisdiction of ROCOR. Rose's own disciple, a fellow monastic priest published under the name Hieromonk Damascene, produced a book entitled Christ the Eternal Tao, in which the author draws parallels between the concept of the Tao in Chinese religion and the concept of the Logos in classical Greek philosophy and Eastern Christian theology.

Watts also studied written Chinese and practised Chinese brush calligraphy with Hasegawa as well as with Hodo Tobase, who taught at the academy. Watts became proficient in Classical Chinese. While he was noted for an interest in Zen Buddhism, his reading and discussions delved into Vedanta, "the new physics", cybernetics, semantics, process philosophy, natural history, and the anthropology of sexuality.

== Middle years ==
Watts left the faculty in the mid-1950s. In 1953, he began what became a long-running weekly radio program at Pacifica Radio station KPFA in Berkeley. Like other volunteer programmers at the listener-sponsored station, Watts was not paid for his broadcasts. These weekly broadcasts continued until 1962, by which time he had attracted a "legion of regular listeners".

Watts continued to give numerous talks and seminars, recordings of which were broadcast on KPFA and other radio stations during his life. These recordings are broadcast to this day. For example, in 1970, Watts's lectures were broadcast on Sunday mornings on San Francisco radio station KSAN; and even today a number of radio stations continue to have an Alan Watts program in their weekly program schedules. Original tapes of his broadcasts and talks are currently held by the Pacifica Radio Archives, based at KPFK in Los Angeles, and at the Electronic University archive founded by his son, Mark Watts.

In 1957 Watts, then 42, published one of his best-known books, The Way of Zen, which focused on philosophical explication and history. Besides drawing on the lifestyle and philosophical background of Zen in India and China and Japan, Watts introduced ideas drawn from general semantics (directly from the writings of Alfred Korzybski) and also from Norbert Wiener's early work on cybernetics, which had recently been published. Watts offered analogies from cybernetic principles possibly applicable to the Zen life. The book sold well, eventually becoming a modern classic, and helped widen his lecture circuit.

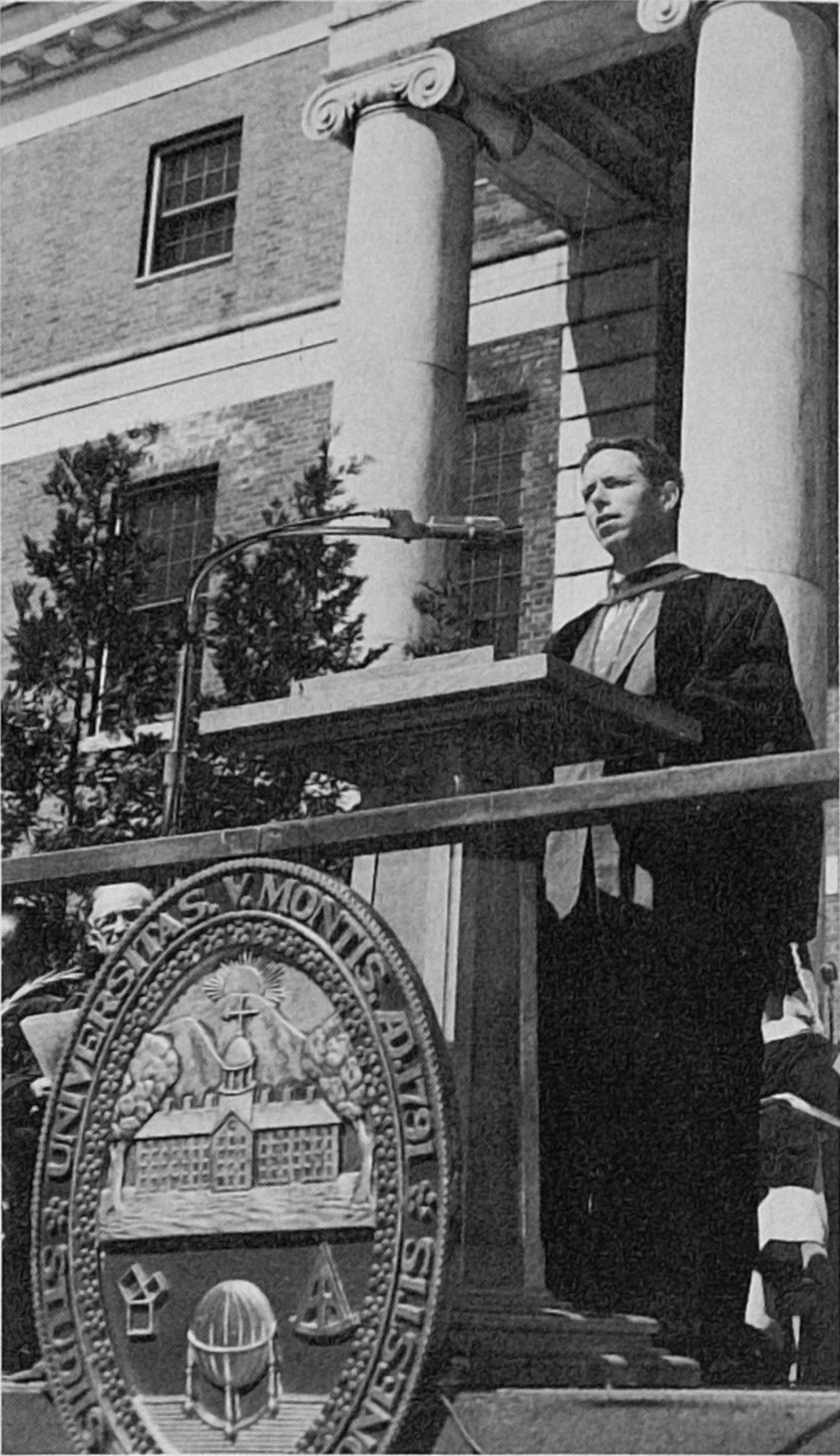
Alan Watts delivering his address "Faith Beyond Belief" at the University of Vermont on 15 June 1958, just after receiving his honorary Doctor of Divinity

In 1958, Watts toured parts of Europe with his father, meeting the Swiss psychiatrist Carl Jung and the German psychotherapist Karlfried Graf Dürckheim.

Upon returning to the United States, Watts recorded two seasons of a television series (1959–1960) for KQED public television in San Francisco, "Eastern Wisdom and Modern Life".

In the 1960s, Watts became interested in how identifiable patterns in nature tend to repeat themselves from the smallest of scales to the most immense. This became one of his passions in his research and thought.

Though never affiliated for long with any one academic institution, he was Professor of Comparative Philosophy at the American Academy of Asian Studies, had a fellowship at Harvard University (1962–1964), and was a Scholar at San Jose State University (1968). He lectured college and university students as well as the general public. His lectures and books gave him influence on the American intelligentsia of the 1950s–1970s, but he was often seen as an outsider in academia. When questioned sharply by students during his talk at University of California, Santa Cruz, in 1970, Watts responded, as he had from the early sixties, that he was not an academic philosopher but rather "a philosophical entertainer."

Some of Watts's writings published in 1958 (e.g., his book Nature, Man and Woman and his essay "The New Alchemy") mentioned some of his early views on the use of psychedelic drugs for mystical insight. Watts had begun to experiment with psychedelics, initially with mescaline given to him by Oscar Janiger. He tried LSD several times in 1958, with various research teams led by Keith S. Ditman, Sterling Bunnell Jr., and Michael Agron. He also tried cannabis and concluded that it was a useful and interesting psychoactive drug that gave the impression of time slowing down. Watts's books of the '60s reveal the influence of these chemical adventures on his outlook. He later said about psychedelic drug use, "If you get the message, hang up the phone. For psychedelic drugs are simply instruments, like microscopes, telescopes, and telephones. The biologist does not sit with eye permanently glued to the microscope; he goes away and works on what he has seen."

=== Applied aesthetics ===
Watts sometimes ate with his group of neighbours in Druid Heights (near Mill Valley, California), who had set up a community, living in what has been called "shared bohemian poverty". Druid Heights was founded by the writer Elsa Gidlow, and Watts dedicated his book The Joyous Cosmology to the people of this neighbourhood. He later dedicated his autobiography to Elsa Gidlow.

Regarding his intention for living, Watts attempted to lessen the alienation that accompanies the experience of being human that he felt plagued the modern Westerner, and to lessen the ill will that was an unintentional by-product of alienation from the natural world. He felt such teaching could improve the world, at least to a degree. He also articulated the possibilities for greater incorporation of aesthetics (for example: better architecture, more art, more fine cuisine) in American life. In his autobiography, he wrote, "... cultural renewal comes about when highly differentiated cultures mix".

== Later years ==
In his writings of the 1950s, he conveyed his admiration for the practicality in the historical achievements of Chan (Zen) in the Far East, for it had fostered farmers, architects, builders, folk physicians, artists, and administrators among the monks who had lived in the monasteries of its lineages. In his mature work, he presents himself as "Zennist" in spirit as he wrote in his last book, Tao: The Watercourse Way. Child rearing, the arts, cuisine, education, law and freedom, architecture, sexuality, and the uses and abuses of technology were all of great interest to him.

Though known for his discourses on Zen, he was also influenced by ancient Hindu scriptures, especially Vedanta and Yoga, aspects of which influenced Chan and Zen. He spoke extensively about the nature of the divine reality that Man misses: how the contradiction of opposites is the method of life and the means of cosmic and human evolution, how our fundamental ignorance is rooted in the exclusive nature - the instinctive grasping at identity, mind and ego, how to come in touch with the Field of Consciousness and Light, and other cosmic principles.

Watts sought to resolve his feelings of alienation from the institutions of marriage and the values of American society, as revealed in his comments on love relationships in "Divine Madness" and on perception of the organism-environment in "The Philosophy of Nature". In looking at social issues, he was concerned with the necessity for international peace, for tolerance, and understanding among disparate cultures.

Watts also came to feel acutely conscious of a growing ecological predicament. Writing, for example, in the early 1960s: "Can any melting or burning imaginable get rid of these ever-rising mountains of ruin—especially when the things we make and build are beginning to look more and more like rubbish even before they are thrown away?" These concerns were later expressed in a television pilot filmed at Druid Heights in 1971. Titled Alan Watts: Conversation with Myself, the film was produced by KQED for National Educational Television and shown across the country on PBS channels in 1975.

== Death ==
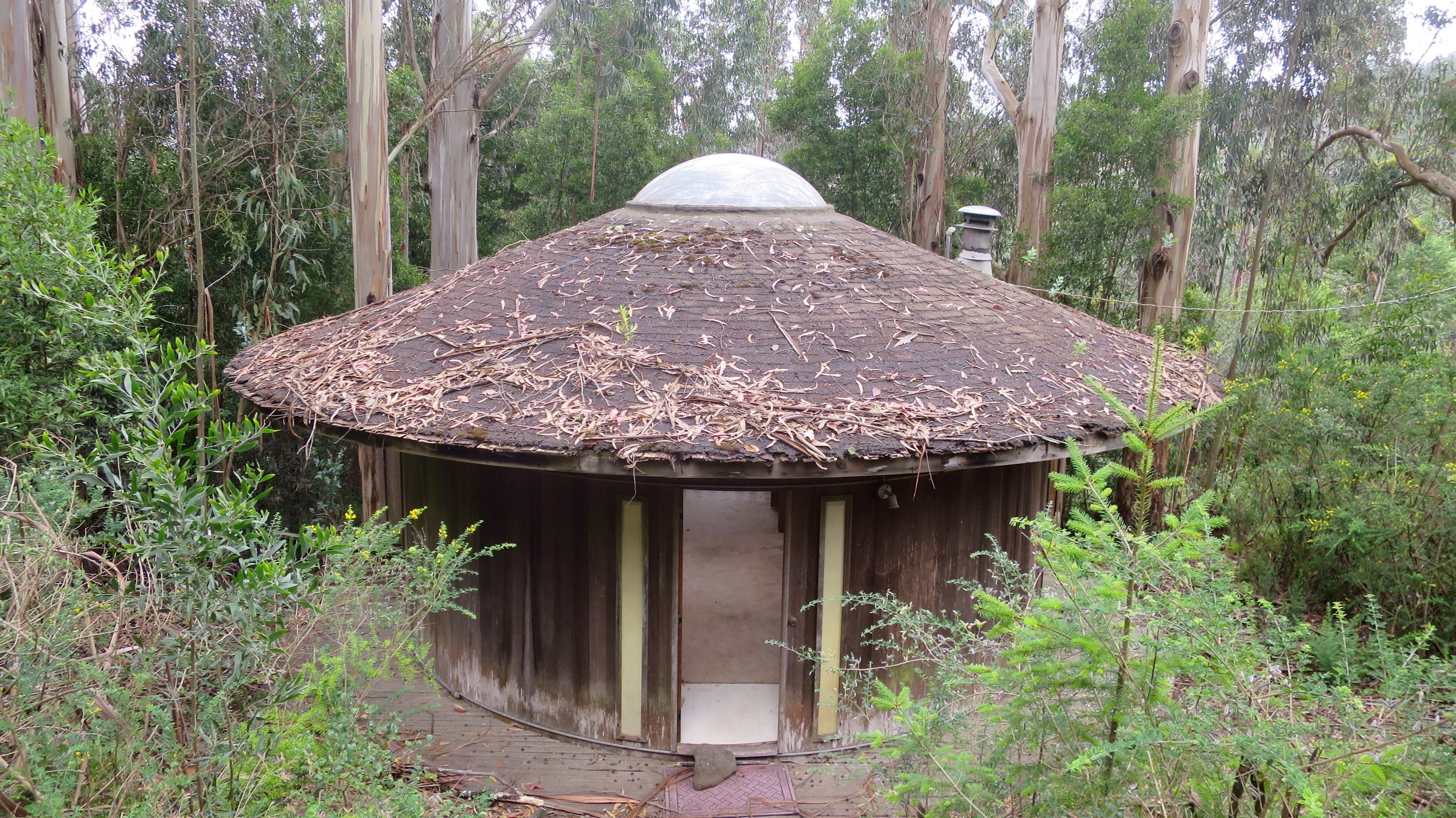
The Alan Watts Library in Druid Heights, where some of Watts's ashes were buried

In October 1973, Watts returned from a European lecture tour to his cabin in Druid Heights, California. Friends and relatives of Watts had been concerned about him for some time over his alcoholism. On 16 November 1973, at age 58, he died in the Mandala House in Druid Heights. His body was discovered at 6:00 a.m. and quickly cremated on a wood pyre on Muir Beach at 8:30 a.m. by Buddhist monks before any authorities could attend to the scene. His ashes were split, with half buried near his library at Druid Heights and half at the Green Gulch Monastery.

Alan Watts was reported to have been under treatment for a heart condition. His son Mark Watts later investigated his father's death and found that he had planned it out meticulously. Mary Jane Watts later wrote that Watts had told her, "The secret of life is knowing when to stop". Watts's father, Laurence Wilson Watts, died in 1974, just one year after his son. A personal account of Watts's last years and approach to death is given by Al Chung-liang Huang in Watts's posthumous work Tao: The Watercourse Way.

== Views ==
=== On spiritual and social identity ===
Regarding his ethical outlook, Watts felt that absolute morality had nothing to do with the fundamental realization of one's deep spiritual identity. He advocated social rather than personal ethics. In his writings, Watts was increasingly concerned with ethics applied to relations between humanity and the natural environment and between governments and citizens. He wrote out of an appreciation of a racially and culturally diverse social landscape.

He often said that he wished to act as a bridge between the ancient and the modern, between East and West, and between culture and nature.

=== Worldview ===
In several of his later publications, especially Beyond Theology and The Book: On the Taboo Against Knowing Who You Are, Watts put forward a worldview, drawing on Hinduism, Chinese philosophy, pantheism or panentheism, and modern science, in which he maintains that the whole universe consists of a cosmic Self playing hide-and-seek (Lila); hiding from itself (Maya) by becoming all the living and non-living things in the universe and forgetting what it really is—the upshot being that we are all IT in disguise (Tat Tvam Asi). In this worldview, Watts asserts that our conception of ourselves as an "ego in a bag of skin", or "skin-encapsulated ego" is a myth; the entities we call the separate "things" are merely aspects or features of the whole.

Watts's books frequently include discussions reflecting his keen interest in patterns that occur in nature and that are repeated in various ways and at a wide range of scales—including the patterns to be discerned in the history of civilizations.

=== Supporters and critics ===
Watts's explorations and teaching brought him into contact with many noted intellectuals, artists, and American teachers in the human potential movement. His friendship with poet Gary Snyder nurtured his sympathies with the budding environmental movement, to which Watts gave philosophical support. He also encountered Robert Anton Wilson, who credited Watts with being one of his "Light[s] along the Way" in the opening appreciation of his 1977 book Cosmic Trigger: The Final Secret of the Illuminati. Werner Erhard attended workshops given by Alan Watts and said of him, "He pointed me toward what I now call the distinction between Self and Mind. After my encounter with Alan, the context in which I was working shifted."

Watts has been criticized by Buddhists such as Philip Kapleau and D. T. Suzuki for allegedly misinterpreting several key Zen Buddhist concepts. In particular, he drew criticism from Zen masters who maintain that zazen must entail a strict and specific means of sitting, as opposed to being a cultivated state of mind that is available at any moment in any situation (which traditionally might be possible by a very few after intense and dedicated effort in a formal sitting practice). Typical of these is Roshi Kapleau's claim that Watts dismissed zazen on the basis of only half a koan.

In regard to the half-koan, Robert Baker Aitken reports that Suzuki told him, "I regret to say that Mr. Watts did not understand that story." In his talks, Watts defined zazen practice by saying, "A cat sits until it is tired of sitting, then gets up, stretches, and walks away", and referred out of context to Zen master Bankei who said: "Even when you're sitting in meditation, if there's something you've got to do, it's quite all right to get up and leave".

However, Watts did have his supporters in the Zen community, including Shunryu Suzuki, the founder of the San Francisco Zen Center. As David Chadwick recounted in his biography of Suzuki, Crooked Cucumber: the Life and Zen Teaching of Shunryu Suzuki, when a student of Suzuki's disparaged Watts by saying "we used to think he was profound until we found the real thing", Suzuki fumed with a sudden intensity, saying, "You completely miss the point about Alan Watts! You should notice what he has done. He is a great bodhisattva."

Watts's biographers saw him—after his stint as an Anglican priest—as representative of not so much a religion but as a lone-wolf thinker and social rascal. In David Stuart's biography, Watts is seen as an unusually gifted speaker and writer driven by his own interests, enthusiasms, and demons. Elsa Gidlow, whom Watts called "sister", refused to be interviewed for the biography, but later painted a kinder picture of Watts's life in her own autobiography, Elsa, I Come with My Songs. According to critic Erik Davis, his "writings and recorded talks still shimmer with a profound and galvanizing lucidity."

Unabashed, Watts was not averse to acknowledging his rascal nature, referring to himself in his autobiography In My Own Way as "a sedentary and contemplative character, an intellectual, a Brahmin, a mystic and also somewhat of a disreputable epicurean who has three wives, seven children and five grandchildren".

== Personal life ==
Watts married three times and had seven children (five daughters and two sons). He met Eleanor Everett (1918–1976) in 1936, when her mother, Ruth Fuller Everett, brought her to London to study piano. They met at the Buddhist Lodge, were engaged the following year and married in April 1938. A daughter was born in 1938 and another in 1942. Their marriage ended in 1949, but Watts continued to correspond with his former mother-in-law. According to his daughter Anne, in The Collected Letters of Alan Watts, Watts told his parents that Eleanor was getting a divorce in Reno, when in actuality, "she was granted an annulment, something that would have been difficult for his parents to understand."

In 1950, Watts married Dorothy DeWitt (1921–2020). He moved to San Francisco in early 1951 to teach. They had five children. The couple separated in the early 1960s after Watts met Mary Jane Yates King (called "Jano" in his circle; b. 1928) while lecturing in New York.

After a divorce in 1962, he married King. The couple divided their time between Sausalito, California, where they lived on a houseboat called the Vallejo, and a secluded cabin in Druid Heights, on the southwest flank of Mount Tamalpais north of San Francisco. King died in 2015.

He also maintained relations with Jean Burden, his lover and the inspiration/editor of Nature, Man and Woman. In regard to their affair, Burden has said that Watts "was a very difficult man to be in love with. He was a rogue. He drank too much. Women were catnip to him. I finally couldn't reconcile his moral hypocrisy." And yet, she called him, "one of the most fascinating men I have ever met."

Watts was a heavy smoker throughout his life and, after the mid-1950s, drank heavily.

His daughter, Anne Watts, has noted that some people have "knocked him [Alan] off the pedestal" upon discovering that her father was an alcoholic and a womanizer, but she maintains that "the work that he did stands on its own and that people all over the world write to us all the time to say how his work has transformed their lives in some way."

== In popular culture ==
- Northern Irish singer Van Morrison wrote "Alan Watts Blues", from his 1987 album Poetic Champions Compose, after reading Watts's mountain journal "Cloud-hidden, Whereabouts Unknown".
- His quote "We think of time as a one-way motion," from his lecture Time & The More It Changes appears at the beginning of the first-season finale of the Loki TV show along with quotes from Neil Armstrong, Greta Thunberg, Malala Yousafzai, Nelson Mandela, Ellen Johnson Sirleaf, and Maya Angelou.
- Several songs by the American indie rock band STRFKR sample audio from Watts's lectures.
- The 2013 Spike Jonze movie Her, set in the near future, includes an AI based on Watts.
- The voice of Alan Watts with words from "Tao of Philosophy" featured in Alexander Ekman's ballet "PLAY".
- An audio clip from "Out of Your Mind: The Nature of Consciousness" is used in the volume 3 trailer for the Netflix adult animated anthology series, Love, Death & Robots.
- Watts is sampled in the songs "The Incredible True Story" by Logic, "Rivers Between Us" by Draconian, "I Am S/H(im)e[r]" by Giraffes? Giraffes!, "Overthinker" and "ANGST" by INZO, "Forget the Money" by Nick Bateman, "The Parable" by The Contortionist, "Memento Mori" by Architects, "Gyre", "Pyre", "Ships in the Night", "|CARNAL|", "|HEAD|", "|HEART|", "|SIGHT|", "|SOUND|" among others by Nothing More, "Music on My Teeth" by DJ Koze, "Sunrise" by Our Last Night, "Cypher" by Northlane and “Come Together” by Nox Vahn.
- The 2015 Time magazine piece by Shane Parish called "Alan Watts: Why Modern Civilization is a Vicious Circle" is built largely on direct quotations from Alan Watts's book, 'The Wisdom of Insecurity', where Watts argues that modern life is trapped in a self-reinforcing loop of future-oriented striving and dissatisfaction.
- The 2017 video game Everything contains quotes from Watts's lectures. (The creator previously worked on Her, which also referenced Watts.)
- Watts is sampled in Dreams, a 2019 cinema and television advertisement for the Cunard cruise line.
- The generative soundscape app Endel released "Wiggly Wisdom" in 2021, a collaboration with the Alan Watts Organization featuring clips from Watts's lectures "World as Play" and "Pursuit of Pleasure".
- In the 21st century, Watts's lectures have been adapted into various multimedia formats. A notable example is the immersive 360-degree dome experience titled Trust the Universe: The Philosophy of Alan Watts. Produced by Spherical Pictures in collaboration with the Alan Watts Organization, the show features original voice recordings of Watts's teachings set to synchronized fractal animations and a surround-sound score. The production has been exhibited at various institutions, including the Chabot Space & Science Center in Oakland and the Oregon Museum of Science & Industry (OMSI)
- In The Queen's Gambit, character Beth Harmon tells her mother Alma Wheatley that she "needs to stop reading Alan Watts. It's annoying." Beth's comment is made in response to Alma stating that Mexico City has only Catholic and no Protestant influence in its culture.
- Gia Margaret samples Alan Watts in her song "body" from the album "Mia Gargaret"
- Ganja White Night features an Alan Watts voiceover on their single "Mask Off" featuring Mr. Bill.

== Works ==
- Watts, Alan W. (1932) An Outline of Zen Buddhism, London: Golden Vista Press.
- Watts, Alan W. (1936) The Spirit of Zen: A Way of Life, Work, and Art in the Far East, London: John Murray.
- Watts, Alan W. (1937) The Legacy of Asia and Western Man: A Study of the Middle Way, London: John Murray.
- Watts, Alan W. (1940) The Meaning of Happiness: The Quest for Freedom of the Spirit in Modern Psychology and the Wisdom of the East, New York: Harper and Row. (2nd ed.; 1968), New York: Harper and Row.
- Watts, Alan (1947) Behold the Spirit: A Study in the Necessity of Mystical Religion, London: John Murray. (2nd ed.; 1971), New York: Random House.
- Watts, Alan (1950) Easter: Its Story and Meaning, New York: H. Schuman.
- Watts, Alan (1950) The Supreme Identity: An Essay on Oriental Metaphysic and the Christian Religion New York: Pantheon Books. (2nd ed.; 1971), New York: Random House.
- Watts, Alan (1951) The Wisdom of Insecurity: A Message for an Age of Anxiety, New York: Pantheon Books.
- Watts, Alan (1953) Myth and Ritual in Christianity, London: Thames and Hudson. ISBN 0-8070-1375-7.
- Watts, Alan (1957) The Way of Zen, New York: Pantheon Books. ISBN 0-375-70510-4.
- Watts, Alan (1958) Nature, Man and Woman, New York: Pantheon Books.
- Watts, Alan (1959) Beat Zen, Square Zen, and Zen, San Francisco, CA: City Lights Books.
- Watts, Alan (1960) This Is It: And Other Essays on Zen and Spiritual Experience, New York: Pantheon Books. ISBN 0-394-71904-2.
- Watts, Alan (1961) Psychotherapy East and West, New York: Pantheon Books. ISBN 0-394-71609-4.
- Watts, Alan (1962) The Joyous Cosmology: Adventures in the Chemistry of Consciousness, New York: Pantheon Books.
- Watts, Alan (1963) The Two Hands of God: The Myths of Polarity New York: George Braziller.
- Watts, Alan (1964) Beyond Theology: The Art of Godmanship, New York: Pantheon Books. ISBN 0-394-71923-9.
- Watts, Alan (1966) The Book: On the Taboo Against Knowing Who You Are, New York: Pantheon Books. ISBN 0-679-72300-5.
- Watts, Alan (1967) Nonsense (illustrations by Greg Irons), San Francisco, CA: Stolen Paper Review Editions.
- Watts, Alan (1970) Does it Matter? Essays on Man’s Relation to Materiality, New York: Pantheon Books. ISBN 0-394-71665-5.
- Watts, Alan (1971) Erotic Spirituality: The Vision of Konarak (photographs by Eliot Elisofon), New York: Macmillan Publishing Co.
- Watts, Alan (1972) In My Own Way: An Autobiography 1915–1965, New York: Pantheon Books. ISBN 978-1577315841.
- Watts, Alan (1972) The Art of Contemplation: A Facsimile Manuscript with Doodles, New York: Pantheon Books.
- Watts, Alan (1973) Cloud-Hidden, Whereabouts Unknown: A Mountain Journal, New York: Pantheon Books. ISBN 0-394-71999-9.
- Watts, Alan (1975) Tao: The Watercourse Way (with Chungliang Al Huang), New York: Pantheon Books.

=== Translations ===
- Pseudo-Dionysius the Areopagite (1944) Theologia Mystica: Being the Treatise of Saint Dionysius pseudo-Areopagite on Mystical Theology, Together with the First and Fifth Epistles. Translated from the Greek and with an introduction by Alan W. Watts. West Park, NY: Holy Cross Press. (2nd ed.; 1971), Sausalito, CA: The Society for Comparative Philosophy.

=== Audio and Video Works, Lectures, and Essays ===
A complete list of Audio Works and Lectures can be found at the Official Alan Watts website.

Including recordings of lectures at major universities and multi-session seminars.

- 1960 Eastern Wisdom and Modern Life, television series, Season 1 (1959) and Season 2 (1960)
- 1960 Essential Lectures
- 1960 From Time to Eternity
- 1960 Lecture on Zen
- 1960 Nature of Consciousness (here)
- 1960 Taoism
- 1960 The Cross of Cards
- 1960 The Value of Psychotic Experience
- 1960 The World As Emptiness
- 1960. Studs Terkel interviews Alan Watts. Discussion on Zen Buddhism.
- 1962 Haiku (Long playing album - MEA LP 1001)
- 1962 This Is It - Alan Watts and friends in a spontaneous musical happening (Long playing album - MEA LP 1007)
- 1968 Psychedelics & Religious Experience, in California Law Review (here)
- 1968 Alan Watts interviews Laura Huxley. Radio Broadcast, Sausalito, CA: KPFA. Discussion on Aldous Huxley, the art of conscious dying and Jiddu Krishnamurti.
- 1969 Why Not Now: The Art of Meditation
- 1970: Radio interview. Studs terkel interviews Alan watts who discusses and reads from his book "In My Own Way".
- 1971 Alan Watts on Living, 5-part television miniseries produced in Vancouver by CBC Television, concerning his views on the detrimental nature of culture.
- 1971 A Conversation With Myself: Part 1 on YouTube, Part 2 on YouTube, Part 3 on YouTube, Part 4 on YouTube
- 1972 The Art of Contemplation, Village Press
- 1972 The Way of Liberation in Zen Buddhism, Alan Watts Journal, vol. 2, nr 1
- 1972: Radio Interview. Elliot Mintz in conversation with Alan watts.
- 1972: Radio interview. Alan reads from his auto biography "In My Own Way" and discusses his life and philosophy with Lex Hixon; host of “In the Spirit” on WBAI Radio.
- 1994 Zen: The Best of Alan Watts (VHS)
- 1998 Summer Of Love: The Spirituality And Consciousness Of The 1960s (Cassette)
- 2004 Out of Your Mind: Essential Listening from the Alan Watts Audio Archives, Sounds True, Inc. Unabridged edition,
- 2005 Do You Do It, or Does It Do You?: How to let the universe meditate you (CD)
- 2007 Zen Meditations with Alan Watts, DVD (here)
- 2013 What If Money Was No Object? (3 minutes) on YouTube
- 2015 Thusness (CD)
- 2016 "You Are The Universe" Youtube
- 2019 PY1 Multimedia Show py1.co
- 2021 'Delta Goodrem' 'PLAY' Bridge Over Troubled Dreams
- 2022 'The Art of Meditation', Sigur Ros & Formless
- 2022 'Accepted Too', Akira The Don

=== Biographical publications ===
- Stuart, David (pseudonym for Edwin Palmer Hoyt Jr.)(1976). Alan Watts: The Rise and Decline of the Ordained Shaman of the Counterculture. Chilton Book Co., Pa. ISBN 978-0801959653
- Lhermite, Pierre (1983) Alan Watts, Taoïste d'Occident, éd. La Table Ronde.
- Furlong, Monica (1986). Genuine Fake: A Biography of Alan Watts. Heinemann (or titled Zen Effects: The Life of Alan Watts as published by Houghton Mifflin Company, Boston, ISBN 0-395-45392-5).

== Bibliography ==
- Aitken, Robert. Original Dwelling Place. Counterpoint. Washington, D.C. 1997. ISBN 1-887178-41-4 (paperback)
- Charters, Ann (ed.). The Portable Beat Reader. Penguin Books. New York. 1992. ISBN 0-670-83885-3 (hardcover); ISBN 0-14-015102-8 (paperback).
- Columbus, Peter J.; Rice, Donadrian L., eds. (2012). Alan Watts—Here and Now: Contributions to Psychology, philosophy, and religion. SUNY Series in Transpersonal and Humanistic psychology. State University of New York Press. ISBN 9781438441993. OCLC 727047968.
- Columbus, Peter J.; Rice, Donadrian L., eds. (2017). Alan Watts—In the Academy: Essays and Lectures. SUNY Series in Transpersonal and Humanistic Psychology. State University of New York Press. ISBN 9781438465555. OCLC 973199412.
- Furlong, Monica (2001) [1986]. Zen Effects: The Life of Alan Watts. Vermont: Skylight Paths. ISBN 9781893361324. OCLC 45639070.
- Gidlow, Elsa, Elsa: I Come with My Songs. Bootlegger Press and Druid Heights Books, San Francisco. 1986. ISBN 0-912932-12-0.
- Kapleau, Philip (1967). Three Pillars of Zen. Beacon Press. ISBN 0-8070-5975-7. OCLC 2611254.
- Sadler, Albert W. (2023). "The Vintage Alan Watts". In Columbus, Peter J. (ed.). Alan Watts in Late-Twentieth-Century Discourse: Commentary and Criticism from 1974 to 1994. Routledge Research in Psychology. Routledge. ISBN 9781003802440. OCLC 1396561530.
- Stirling, Isabel. Zen Pioneer: The Life & Works of Ruth Fuller Sasaki, Shoemaker & Hoard. 2006. ISBN 978-1-59376-110-3.
- Watts, Alan (1972). In My Own Way: An Autobiography, 1915-1965. New York: Random House Pantheon. ISBN 0-394-46911-9. OCLC 347883.
- Watts, Joan; Watts, Anne, eds. (2017). The Collected Letters of Alan Watts. New World Library. ISBN 9781608684151. OCLC 972385299.
- Watts, Alan (1975). Psychotherapy, East and West. Vintage Books. ISBN 9780394716091.
- Watts, Alan (1970). The Joyous Cosmology: Adventures in the Chemistry of Consciousness. Vintage Books. ISBN 0-394-70299-9.
