= List of people from La Jolla =

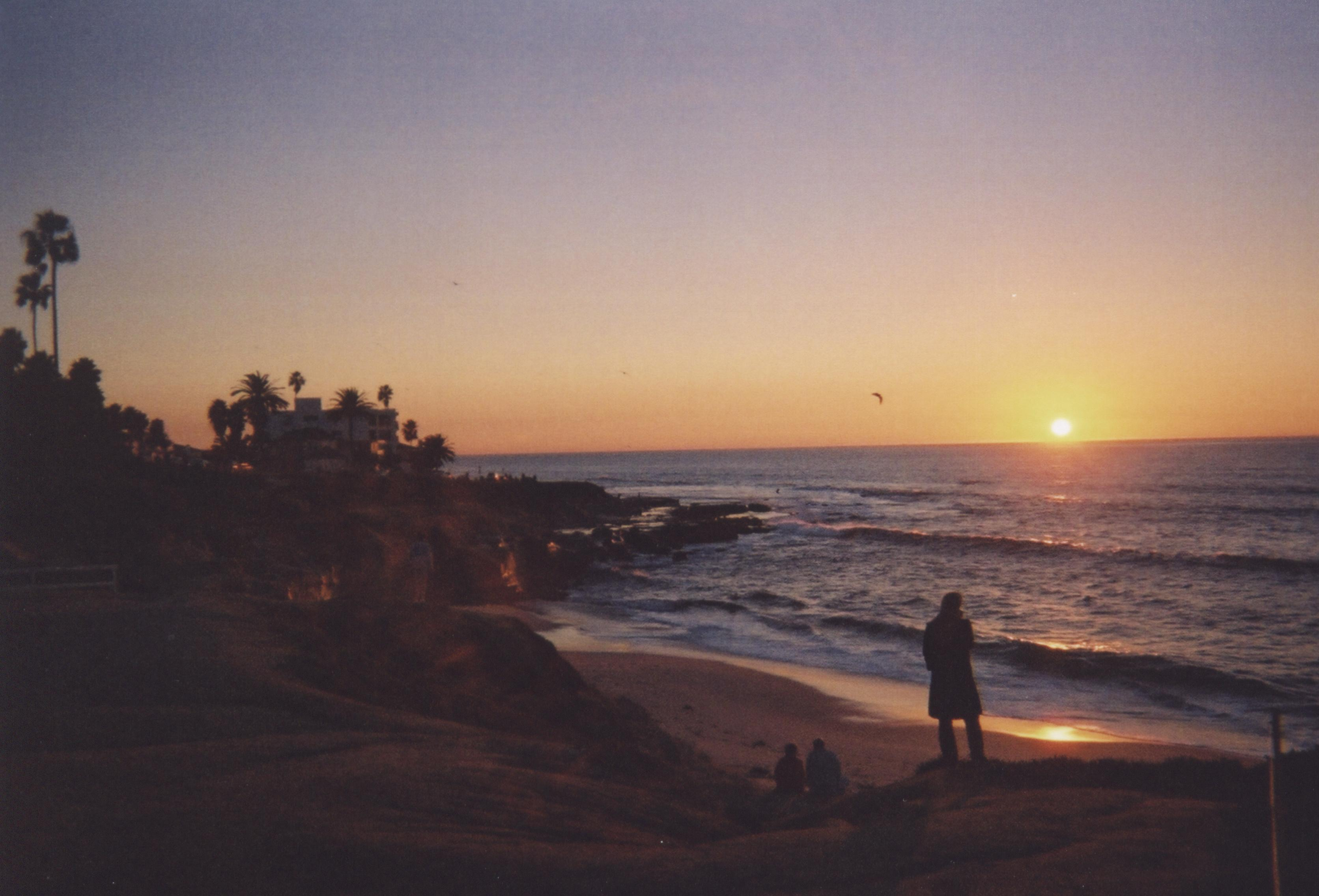
La Jolla

This is a list of notable people who were born or who lived a significant amount of time in La Jolla, San Diego, California.

== Notable residents ==
=== Sports ===
- Buzzie Bavasi – Major League Baseball executive, lived in La Jolla from 1968 until death in 2008
- Rolf Benirschke – placekicker for San Diego Chargers, graduated from La Jolla High School
- Dan Bilzerian – professional poker player, lives in La Jolla
- Debbie Bramwell-Washington – IFBB professional bodybuilder
- Chase Budinger – NBA player for Minnesota Timberwolves, born in La Jolla
- Conor Chinn – professional soccer player for New York Red Bulls, born in La Jolla
- Jonathan Compas – former center for Tampa Bay Buccaneers, other NFL teams, and member of the Boston Fitzgibbon family
- Gerry Driscoll – championship sailor, businessperson, lived in La Jolla until death in 2011
- Dick Enberg – sportscaster for NBC and CBS Sports, resided in La Jolla
- Doug Flutie – quarterback for San Diego Chargers and other NFL teams
- J. J. Isler – yachtswoman, two-time Olympic medalist and America's Cup competitor, born in La Jolla
- Gene Littler – professional golfer, 1961 U.S. Open champion, graduated from La Jolla High School
- John Michels – played for Super Bowl XXXI champion Green Bay Packers, born and raised in La Jolla
- Rey Mysterio – WWE professional wrestler
- Jo Anne Overleese, M.D. (1923–2017) – one of few doctors to have played in All-American Girls Professional Baseball League history, born in La Jolla
- Gabrielle Reece – volleyball player, fashion model, and television celebrity, born in La Jolla
- Xander Schauffele – professional golfer, 2017 Tour Championship winner, born in La Jolla
- Junior Seau – linebacker for San Diego Chargers and other NFL teams, lived in La Jolla
- Bob Skinner – Major League Baseball player, coach, manager, scout, born in La Jolla
- Joel Skinner – manager and third base coach of Major League Baseball's Cleveland Indians, born in La Jolla
- Craig Stadler – professional golfer, graduated from La Jolla High School in 1971
- Alexandra Stevenson – professional tennis player and 1999 semi-finalist at Wimbledon, born and raised in La Jolla
- Zachary Svajda (* 2002) – professional tennis player, born in La Jolla
- Lou Thesz (1916–2002) – professional wrestler
- Bradley Zimmer – outfielder for MLB's Cleveland Indians, born in La Jolla

=== Arts and entertainment ===
- Roger Guy English – Guinness World Record holder

==== Actors ====
- Francesca Capaldi – actress, The Peanuts Movie
- Gary Erwin – TV personality and member of docu-series Addicted to Beauty
- Marcia Gay Harden – Oscar-winning and Tony-winning actress
- Shane Harper – actor and musician
- Charlotte Henry – actress
- Izetta Jewel – stage actress, women's rights activist and local radio personality
- James Maslow – actor, songwriter and singer
- Danica McKellar – actress
- Zoe McLellan – actress
- Gregory Peck – Oscar-winning actor
- Autumn Reeser – actress (The O.C.), born in La Jolla and lived there until age 17
- Cliff Robertson – actor, born in La Jolla, attended La Jolla High School
- Shay Rudolph – actress and social media personality
- Raquel Welch – actress, attended La Jolla High School
- Robin Wright – actress, attended La Jolla High School

==== Film and television executives ====
- Donald De Line – studio executive and film producer (Pretty Woman) at Walt Disney Productions and its Touchstone Pictures division since 1985, native La Jollan
- Ellen Goldsmith-Vein – producer of films and television series including The Maze Runner trilogy, attended La Jolla High School
- Gore Verbinski – director of Pirates of the Caribbean, attended La Jolla High School

==== Writers ====
- Tucker Carlson – political commentator, journalist, writer, television talk show host, raised in La Jolla, attended La Jolla Country Day
- Raymond Chandler – noir novelist, moved to La Jolla and uttered the aphorism about La Jolla, "A nice place — for old people and their parents"
- Deepak Chopra – spiritual writer, ran his Center for Well Being in La Jolla until recently
- Peter Economy – author, editor, ghostwriter, and publishing consultant
- Debbie Ford – self-help author of best-selling The Dark Side of the Light Chasers (1998)
- Audrey Geisel – Dr. Seuss' widow
- Udo Keppler – political cartoonist, publisher, Native American advocate, contributor to Judge and Leslie's Weekly magazines, and son of cartoonist Joseph Keppler
- Tony Olmos – screenwriter, filmmaker and musician, resides in La Jolla
- Anne Rice – novelist and author of Interview with the Vampire, moved to La Jolla from New Orleans in March 2005
- Alan Russell – best-selling mystery and crime novelist, attended La Jolla High School
- Dr. Seuss (Theodor Geisel) – children's author, long-time resident of La Jolla, namesake of Geisel Library at the University of California, San Diego

==== Music ====
- J. J. Cale – singer-songwriter and guitarist, lived and died in La Jolla
- Robbin Crosby – rock musician who played electric guitar for the metal band Ratt, born and attended high school in La Jolla
- Warren DeMartini – rock musician who plays electric guitar for the metal band Ratt, attended high school in La Jolla
- Michael Franks – musician, singer and recording artist, born in La Jolla
- Amelita Galli-Curci – Italian operatic coloratura soprano, lived and died in La Jolla
- Sam Hinton – folk singer and marine biologist
- Alyssa Jacey – singer-songwriter
- Alicia Keys – pianist and singer-songwriter
- Andy Skib – guitarist and keyboardist in David Cook's band
- Ian Ward (actor) - actor and singer

==== Visual and performance art ====
- Armi Kuusela – winner of the first Miss Universe beauty pageant in 1952, lives in La Jolla with her husband, Albert Williams

=== Crime ===
- Ivan Boesky – financier convicted of insider trading, lived until death in 2024 in La Jolla with his second wife, Ana Boesky, and their child
- Betty Broderick – convicted of second degree murder, lived in La Jolla, found guilty on December 11, 1991, and sentenced to 32 years to life in prison for the murders of ex-husband Dan Broderick and his second wife, Linda Kolkena
- Andrew Cunanan – infamous spree killer of Gianni Versace and three others, graduated from The Bishop's School in 1987

=== Government and politics ===
- Richard Goodwin Capen Jr. – former United States Ambassador to Spain, chairman of Miami Herald and vice chairman of Knight Ridder, longtime resident of La Jolla
- David Hall – former governor of Oklahoma, moved to La Jolla following his release from federal prison with his wife, former Oklahoma First Lady Jo Evans Hall; died 2016
- Hyrum Rex Lee – former American Samoa governor; lived with his wife, First Lady Lillian Lee, in a $5 million high-rise condo in the Shore Towers until their deaths in 2001 and 2010, respectively
- John McCain – United States senator from Arizona, 2008 presidential nominee of the Republican Party, owned a home in La Jolla with his wife, Cindy McCain
- Geoffrey R. Pyatt – United States Ambassador to Ukraine, born in La Jolla in 1963
- Mitt Romney – former governor of Massachusetts and the Republican nominee for the 2012 presidential election, and his wife, former Massachusetts First Lady Ann Romney, purchased a $12 million vacation home in La Jolla in 2008

=== Business and finance ===
- David C. Copley – former owner of The San Diego Union-Tribune and member of the Forbes 400 until his death in 2012
- Benjamin Graham – economist and value investor, lived in La Jolla at the end of his life
- Trip Hawkins – 64th employee at Apple Computer and founder of Electronic Arts, The 3DO Company and Digital Chocolate, graduated from Muirlands Junior High and La Jolla High School
- Irwin Mark Jacobs – electrical engineer, co-founder and chairman of the board of Qualcomm
- William Lerach – securities lawyer whose cases include Enron
- Joseph Tsai – founder of Alibaba Group
- Ted Waitt – founder of Gateway, Inc.

=== Science and technology ===
- Geoffrey Burbidge and Margaret Burbidge – astronomers holding positions at UCSD after many years, reside near La Jolla Shores
- Francis Crick – Nobel Prize in medicine winner for his work to identify the essential structure of DNA, long-time resident of La Jolla
- Hillman Curtis – web designer
- Lawrence J. Fogel – inventor of active noise cancellation, studied artificial intelligence, long-time resident of La Jolla
- Robert Galambos – researcher who discovered how bats use echolocation
- Ronald Lewis Graham – mathematician, lived and died in La Jolla
- Clive Granger – 2003 Nobel Prize in Economics winner; long-time resident of La Jolla
- Roger Guillemin – winner of the Nobel prize in Physiology or Medicine in 1977 for his work in establishing foundational discoveries in the field of endocrinology; co-founder of the Salk Institute and long-time resident of La Jolla
- Augustus Braun Kinzel – metallurgist, president and CEO of Salk Institute, Union Carbide VP, founding President of the National Academy of Engineering, and consultant to the Manhattan Project in Los Alamos, lived in La Jolla 1957–1986 (death)
- Kary Mullis – Nobel Prize in Chemistry-winning biochemist and surfer from La Jolla, invented the polymerase chain reaction method of DNA analysis
- Walter Munk – oceanographer, lived in La Jolla
- Leslie Orgel – research chemist, lived in La Jolla 1964–2007
- Erving Polster – psychologist and pioneer of Gestalt therapy
- Miriam Polster – psychologist, wife of Erving Polster, advocate of Gestalt therapy
- Jeffrey B. Remmel – mathematician, worked at UC San Diego and died in La Jolla
- Sally Ride – astronaut, lived and died in La Jolla
- Carl Rogers – psychologist and researcher of psychotherapy
- Jonas Salk – virologist and founder of Salk Institute for Biological Studies in La Jolla who developed the first successful inactivated polio vaccine
- Ellen Browning Scripps – philanthropist, founder of Scripps Institute of Oceanography and Scripps College, member of the Forbes 400
- K. Barry Sharpless – Nobel Prize in Chemistry winner, lives in La Jolla
- Benjamin Elazari Volcani – microbiologist
