= Barry Stevens =

Barry Stevens may refer to:

- Barry Stevens (basketball) (1963–2007), American basketball player and coach
- Barry Stevens (cricketer) (born 1929), Australian cricketer
- Barry Stevens (technology developer) (born 1949), American scientist, author, business developer and entrepreneur
- Barry Stevens (therapist) (1902–1985), American Gestalt therapist
- Barry Stevens (filmmaker) (born 1952), Canadian filmmaker
