= Violet Oaklander =

American psychologist and author (1927–2021)

Violet Solomon Oaklander (April 18, 1927 – September 21, 2021) was a child and adolescent therapist known for her method of integrating Gestalt therapy theory and practice with play therapy.

Oaklander was the author of the books Windows to Our Children: A Gestalt Therapy Approach to Children and Adolescents (The Gestalt Journal Press, 1978; published in 16 languages) and Hidden Treasure: A Map to the Child's Inner Self (Routledge, 2006; published in eight languages), as well as several journal articles, book chapters, and audio and video recordings on psychotherapeutic work with children. Oaklander had a Ph.D. in clinical psychology, a Master of Arts in marriage, family and child counseling, a Master of Science in special education with emotionally disturbed children, and was a certified Gestalt therapist.

== Early life ==
Violet Solomon Oaklander was born on April 18, 1927, in Lowell, Massachusetts, to a Jewish Russian immigrant family. She grew up in Cambridge, Massachusetts, with her parents Joe and Mollie Solomon and her two older brothers.

As a five-year-old child, Oaklander sustained a burn to a large part of her torso, arms, and legs in a home accident, in which a family friend spilled a large pot of boiling cabbage and water on her. Oaklander stated in interviews that the suffering and trauma she sustained in the hospital while being treated for this burn was the spark that ignited her interest in working with children. About this childhood injury, Oaklander said, “It could be the beginning of why I do this work... Everything I've ever worked on, especially with my Gestalt therapy training... always went back to that burn...”

== Career ==
Oaklander's unique approach to working with children, which combines Gestalt Therapy theory, philosophy, and practice with a variety of expressive techniques, won international recognition. Oaklander earned a lifetime achievement award from the Association of Play Therapy, U.S., and received numerous other awards for her contribution to the mental health field. In February 2012, Oaklander was honored and awarded by the Edna Reiss-Sophie Greenberg Chair at the Reiss-Davis Child Study Center in Los Angeles.

For 27 years, Oaklander conducted a two-week training program in California which was attended by participants from all over the world. In addition, Oaklander was a regular instructor for many years with the extension programs of the University of California campuses in Santa Cruz, Santa Barbara, and San Diego, and the Pacifica Graduate Institute.

=== Early career working with children and adolescents ===
After graduating from California State University, Long Beach in 1965, Oaklander began teaching elementary school in the Long Beach Unified School District. After one of her music lessons with first graders, Oaklander was reported to the school authorities as a communist because she was singing and teaching Woody Guthrie songs to the children. Oaklander said about her early work, "I guess I was an alternative teacher before I knew what that meant." It was during this time that Oaklander began to work with emotionally troubled children. In an interview, Oaklander said, "The counselor of the school that I worked in said, 'Why don't you look into teaching emotionally disturbed children? You'd be really good at that, and they're just starting those programs.' This was in the middle of '67. So, I went to visit those classes... and I thought it was wonderful. I mean, you could do whatever you wanted, and there were twelve kids and an aide. So, I transferred into doing that, and it was amazing."

Oaklander worked for six years with emotionally troubled children in Long Beach schools, after which she won a United States Office of Education Fellowship to obtain her master's degree in special education with emotionally disturbed children at California State University, Long Beach in 1971. While in this program, Oaklander studied the work of various professionals in the field of child psychology, including Virginia Axline, a psychologist and a pioneer in the use of play therapy, and Clark Moustakas, one of the leading experts on humanistic and clinical psychology at the time, and became increasingly interested in psychotherapy with children and adolescents. Speaking about the role of play in her work, Oaklander said, "Children play-act part of their lives, and by doing this, bring up things that happened to them in the past that are still with them, a.k.a., the 'unfinished business.' Play is the child's language. Children will express themselves much more authentically through a drawing or working with clay or doing a scene in sand. It's easier for them to articulate. This is the way the child knows the world and they love doing this."

=== Introduction to Gestalt therapy ===
In 1969, Oaklander's son Michael was suffering from advanced lupus. The last six months of his life, when he was increasingly ill and frequently hospitalized, was a very difficult time for Oaklander. A friend invited Oaklander to go to a workshop led by Jim Simkin, an early practitioner of Gestalt therapy, at the Esalen Institute in Big Sur, California. About this workshop, Oaklander said, "I was in this group with Jim Simkin for a week, and it totally changed my life... it somehow transformed me." Eventually, after Michael's death, and with the impression Jim Simkin and Gestalt therapy had made on her, Oaklander decided to enter a training program at the Gestalt Therapy Institute of Los Angeles.

From 1969 to 1972, Oaklander trained to be a Gestalt therapist, and as a result of this training, Oaklander decided to incorporate Gestalt therapy into her psychotherapy work with children. About combining these techniques, Oaklander said, "While I was training [in Gestalt therapy], I noticed they never talked about children... So I started doing a lot of thinking about applying Gestalt therapy to children, the theory, and the philosophy. It really seemed to fit for me. I brought that into my classroom with emotionally disturbed children. I did a lot of experimenting with some of the practices and techniques with the theoretical foundation in my mind of what I was doing. It was so successful." It was during this time that Oaklander pursued and achieved her Master of Arts in Counseling from Chapman University.

== Windows to Our Children ==
While she was teaching a class at Chapman University in the mid-1970s titled "Counseling with Children," Oaklander wrote a paper about her work approach that later turned out to be the outline for her now-renowned book, Windows to Our Children: A Gestalt Therapy Approach to Children and Adolescents. Also during this time, Oaklander was leading workshops around Los Angeles and Orange Counties. The participants often asked for more written information, which gave Oaklander the idea to turn her paper into a book. Ultimately, Oaklander completed the early version of Windows as her PhD dissertation while attending International College in 1978. The first edition of Windows was published by Real People Press, Moab, Utah, in 1978. and later by the Gestalt Journal Press.

About Windows, Gestalt therapist Edwin C. Nevis wrote, "[O]ne book, Windows to Our Children: A Gestalt Therapy Approach to Children and Adolescents (1978), has inspired child therapists all over the world and promulgated the Gestalt approach internationally... Since its publication in 1978, many professionals have become interested in Gestalt therapy through reading her book and attending her trainings. Windows is a classic in the field of child psychotherapy, and read studiously by therapists and students of all theoretical persuasions." Psychotherapist Christiane Elsbree wrote, "Those who have trained with Violet know that she often said, 'I don't fix kids.' Yet her delight in each child, her 'I- Thou' approach, supports the child's growth through facilitated contact and awareness, helping children find who they are and their own rightful path, their emergent path, their own organismic self-regulation and well-being... Over the course of twenty-six years, her two-week training programs in Santa Barbara and Hermosa Beach brought together therapists and counselors from more than twenty-five countries and six continents to form an intensive learning community. The interest in Violet's work brings to light the widespread interest in the theory and practice of Gestalt therapy and what it has to offer world-wide in the field of health and well-being."

Windows has been published in 15 languages in addition to English, including Chinese, Croatian, Czech, Slovak, French, German, Hebrew, Italian, Korean, Lithuanian, Polish, Portuguese, Romanian, Russian, and Spanish.

== Hidden Treasure ==
Oaklander's second book, Hidden Treasure: A Map to the Child's Inner Self, was published in 2006 by Karnac Books, now Routledge, and has been translated into seven additional languages, including German, Korean, Lithuanian, Romanian, Russian, Spanish and Italian. In the introduction to the book, Oaklander wrote about the many audio tapes, articles, chapters in other people's books, talks and presentations she wrote over the years, writing, "I realized I needed to put all these new (since Windows to Our Children) ideas, thoughts, discoveries and developments in my work into one book."

== The Oaklander Model ==
Oaklander's method of incorporating Gestalt therapy into play therapy for children and adolescents became known as the Oaklander Model. About her technique, Oaklander said, "It's a way of talking about things that is very safe, and then gradually bringing it back to [the children], where they can own their feelings. We use all these techniques to give [children and adolescents] experience with parts of themselves that they no longer own or experience. We might do a lot of sensory work, even with adolescents, in order to help them get back in touch with their senses–the touching, and looking, and listening, and tasting, and smelling–and to feel their senses, which is an integral part of the organism, the senses."

The Oaklander Model applies Gestalt therapy principles into therapeutic work with children and adolescents, with the goal of bringing back to children the aspects of themselves that they have lost. According to the Oaklander Model, as a child's sense of internal support increases, their ability to express their emotions also increases. Children "become more whole" as they become more aware of their emotions, and the creative and projective techniques found in Gestalt play therapy are essential in making this happen. Oaklander wrote, "Anger is the hardest emotion for anyone, and especially for children, to deal with. It undoubtedly is the root for a lot of their problems. Normalizing and working through angry feelings to attain a calmer state of being is an important aspect of the healing process."

Oaklander believed that the authentic relationship between the therapist and client is the key agent in the therapeutic process, and that without it, no real work can happen. The therapist and the child are two individuals who enter into a non-hierarchical relationship as equals and remain open to what the encounter may bring. The therapist doesn't enter the relationship as an expert, but just as their authentic, genuine self which encourages the client to do the same.

Oaklander also stated that applying Gestalt therapy principles helps children become whole again because Gestalt therapy "enhances the self." Oaklander said that most of her child patients did not feel good about themselves, and didn't know themselves. Therefore, the child being able to say, "This is what I like, this is what I don't like, this is how I get mad," helps the child to feel strong and more sure within themselves. In addition, Oaklander believed that the Gestalt therapy concept of "the present moment" is how the child relates to the therapist, because children do not say, "I really need to deal with my past abuse." Oaklander said, "Trauma from the past becomes part of the present, so when we can bring them out [with the child] and look at them, that is what makes a difference." Further, Oaklander stated, "Gestalt therapy is about helping people become aware of what they do and how they do it, and to encourage living in the present, to 'be here now,' and to help make better choices. Children live in the present more than adults. But rather than becoming 'aware' of what they do, it's a matter of providing the experience for them to understand how they operate in the world. We do it through art and medium. We provide experiments for the child to experience parts of themselves that they had cut away or lost."

In his book Windowframes: Learning the Art of Gestalt Play Therapy the Oaklander Way (2006), Lewis & Clark Graduate School of Education and Counseling professor Peter Mortola, documents his consistent approach to therapy using the Oaklander Model, and identifies a set of therapeutic experiences involving different media, including drawings, clay, sand trays, and puppets, and then shows how each of these therapeutic experiences share a similar underlying structure. In this way, the Oaklander Model engages the child in a playful activity that often reflects very real issues and aspects from the child's own life.

== Criticism ==
Critics of Oaklander's method of working Gestalt therapy techniques and principles into play therapy with children and adolescents say that Gestalt therapy should not be used with children, because Gestalt therapy works primarily with the ego, and children do not have fully developed egos. In response, Oaklander stated, "I strongly believe that Gestalt therapy is so organic that it stands to reason that it fits the development of children. As Fritz Perls used to say, 'Lose your mind and come to your senses.' The child's expression of emotions and the intellectual development of the child, it's all so organic and it's all basic to Gestalt therapy. So to me, how could it not be? Even with adults, it begins in childhood. You don't suddenly block your ability to express emotions as an adult. It starts way back. So, it seems to me that it is very essential and organic and obvious that the development of the child is much akin to Gestalt therapy."

== Violet Solomon Oaklander Foundation ==
Oaklander's legacy is sustained and promoted by the Violet Solomon Oaklander Foundation, a non-profit corporation created to further Oaklander's work. The foundation was founded in 2003, when approximately twenty of Oaklander's family members and long-time colleagues met to discuss various ways of carrying on her work after her retirement. The founding members have worked with Oaklander to launch the VSOF website, develop training materials and programs, publish a quarterly newsletter, create an archive library, network with professionals in multiple countries, and develop a scholarship program to provide training in the Oaklander Model for those in need of assistance.

The first Violet Solomon Oaklander Foundation conference took place in November 2011 in Malibu, California, and featured presentations by a number of founding members and other guest presenters regarding the application and further development of the Oaklander method. Since then, four additional conferences have been held, including the most recent in 2021 which was entirely virtual and ran around the clock with presenters and participants from many different countries.

VSOF Founding member Karen Fried, an international trainer in the Oaklander Model, began in April 2020 hosting weekly, then later bi-monthly, Zoom trainings called "Just For Now: Virtual Use of the Oaklander Model in a Time of Crisis." Oaklander, along with well over 100 participants and instructors from around the world, contributed to this series.

== Personal life ==
Though Oaklander grew up in Cambridge, Massachusetts, she also lived in Miami; New York City; Denver; Albany; and Long Beach, Hermosa Beach, and Santa Barbara, California. After 21 years in Santa Barbara, she moved to Los Angeles to live near her son and daughter-in-law in her retirement. She was married for 26 years to Harold Oaklander (deceased), a licensed social worker and Gestalt therapist. They had three children: Mha Atma S. Khalsa (Arthur), Michael (deceased), and Sara. At the time of her death, Oaklander was nearly fully retired and living in Los Angeles with her family and her cat Shayna. She was an active member of the Violet Solomon Oaklander Foundation.

Oaklander died in bed in Los Angeles, California on September 21, 2021.

== Bibliography ==
=== Books ===
- Windows to Our Children: A Gestalt Therapy Approach to Children and Adolescents (The Gestalt Journal Press, 1978)
- Hidden Treasure: A Map to the Child's Inner Self (Routledge, 2006)

=== Articles and chapters ===
- “Short Term Play Therapy With Grieving Children,” SHORT TERM PLAY THERAPY INTERVENTIONS WITH CHILDREN edited by Heidi Kaduson and Charles Schaeffer, New York: Guilford Publications, Inc., 2000.
- “Group Play Therapy From A Gestalt Therapy Perspective, GROUP PLAY THERAPY: THEORY AND PRACTICE edited by Daniel S. Sweeney, New York: Charles C. Thomas Publisher, Ltd., 1999.
- "Gestalt Play Therapy,” HANDBOOK OF PLAY THERAPY, Volume 2, edited by Kevin J. O'Connor and Charles E. Schaefer, New York: John Wiley and Sons, Inc., 1994.
- "From Meek to Bold," PLAY THERAPY IN ACTION, edited by Terry Kottman and Charles Schaefer, New York: Aronson, 1993.
- "Gestalt Work With Children: Working With Anger and Introjects,” GESTALT THERAPY: PERSPECTIVES AND APPLICATIONS, edited by Edwin C. Nevis, New York: Gardner Press, 1992.
- “A Gestalt Therapy Approach with Children through the Use of Art and Creative Expression,” GESTALT THERAPY AND BEYOND edited by Eric H.Marcus, Cupertino, Cal: Meta Publications, 1979.
- (With Felicia Carroll): “Gestalt Play Therapy: PLAY THERAPY: Theory and Practice: A Comparative Presentation, edited by Kevin J. O’Connor and Lisa Mages Braverman: John Wiley and Sons, Inc., 1967.
- “The Therapy Process With Children and Adolescents,” GESTALT REVIEW, New Jersey. The Analytic Press. Volume 1, No. 4, 1997.
- "The Relationship of Gestalt Therapy to Children," THE GESTALT JOURNAL, New York: The Center for Gestalt Development, Volume V, Number 1 Spring 1982.
- "Working with Anger and Introjects," INSTITUTE OF GUIDANCE COUNSELLORS Journal (Ireland) Vol. 7 1982–1983.

=== Audio ===
- "Gestalt Therapy With Children," Max Sound, Long Beach, California, 1992.
- "The Therapy Process With Children and Adolescents," Max Sound, Long Beach, California, 1992.
- "Working with the Anger of Children and Adolescents,” Max Sound, Long Beach, California, 1992.
- "Helping Children and Adolescents to Become Self-Nurturing," Max Sound, Long Beach, California, 1992.
- "Music as Therapy," Max Sound, Long Beach, California, 1992.
- “Treating Children with Symptoms of Attention Deficit Hyperactive Disorder,” Max Sound, Long Beach, California, 1992/

=== Video ===
- "A Boy and his Anger," Max Sound, Long Beach, California. 1991–1993.
- "An Atypical Sand Tray Session with a 13-year Old Boy,” Max Sound, Long Beach, California, 1991–1993.
- “The Therapy Process in Action: A Session With Carlos,” Max Sound, Long Beach, California, 1991–1993.
- “Child Therapy with the Experts: A Gestalt Therapy Approach,” Allyn and Bacon Publishers, Boston, Massachusetts, 2003.
