= Gestalt prayer =

Statement by psychologist Fritz Perls

The Gestalt prayer is a 56-word statement by psychotherapist Fritz Perls that is taken as a classic expression of Gestalt therapy as a way of life model of which Perls was a founder.

The key idea of the statement is Gestalt practice: the focus on living in response to one's own needs, without projecting onto or taking introjects from others. It also expresses the idea that it is by fulfilling their own needs that people can help others do the same and create space for genuine contact.

== Statement ==
I do my thing and you do your thing.
I am not in this world to live up to your expectations,
And you are not in this world to live up to mine.
You are you, and I am I,
and if by chance we find each other, it's beautiful.
If not, it can't be helped.

— Fritz Perls, "Gestalt Therapy Verbatim", 1969

== Impact and legacy ==
The prayer is well known in gestalt and psychotherapy circles, where it is generally taken as a summarizing statement of the philosophy of personal independence central to gestalt therapy. This philosophy still attracts critics, generally arguing that interpersonal relationships require real, hard work to maintain. Supporters counter that an attitude of independence does not refute this, but rather encourages people to realize that relationships need not be founded on obligation or expectation.

The prayer remains popular in general culture, although the last line is sometimes omitted. In academic discussion, it sometimes acts as a starting point for debate around issues of autonomy and interdependence. However, it does not characterize Gestalt therapy in general, but rather Fritz Perls' personal attitude during the time at the Esalen Institute.

The statement "I am not in this world to live up to your expectations" was used by the reggae artist Peter Tosh in his 1977 song "I Am That I Am".
