= Gestalt Therapy (book) =

1951 book on psychotherapy

- First edition
- Author: Frederick Perls, Ralph Hefferline, Paul Goodman
- Subject: Psychotherapy
- Published: 1951 (Julian Press)
- Pages: 466 pp.

Gestalt Therapy is a 1951 book that outlines an extension to psychotherapy, known as gestalt therapy, written by Fritz Perls, Ralph Hefferline, and Paul Goodman. Presented in two parts, the first introduces psychotherapeutic self-help exercises, and the second presents a theory of personality development and growth.

The book is known in the gestalt community as "PHG".

English literature professor George Levine thought of the book as the only emotionally engaging textbook he knew.

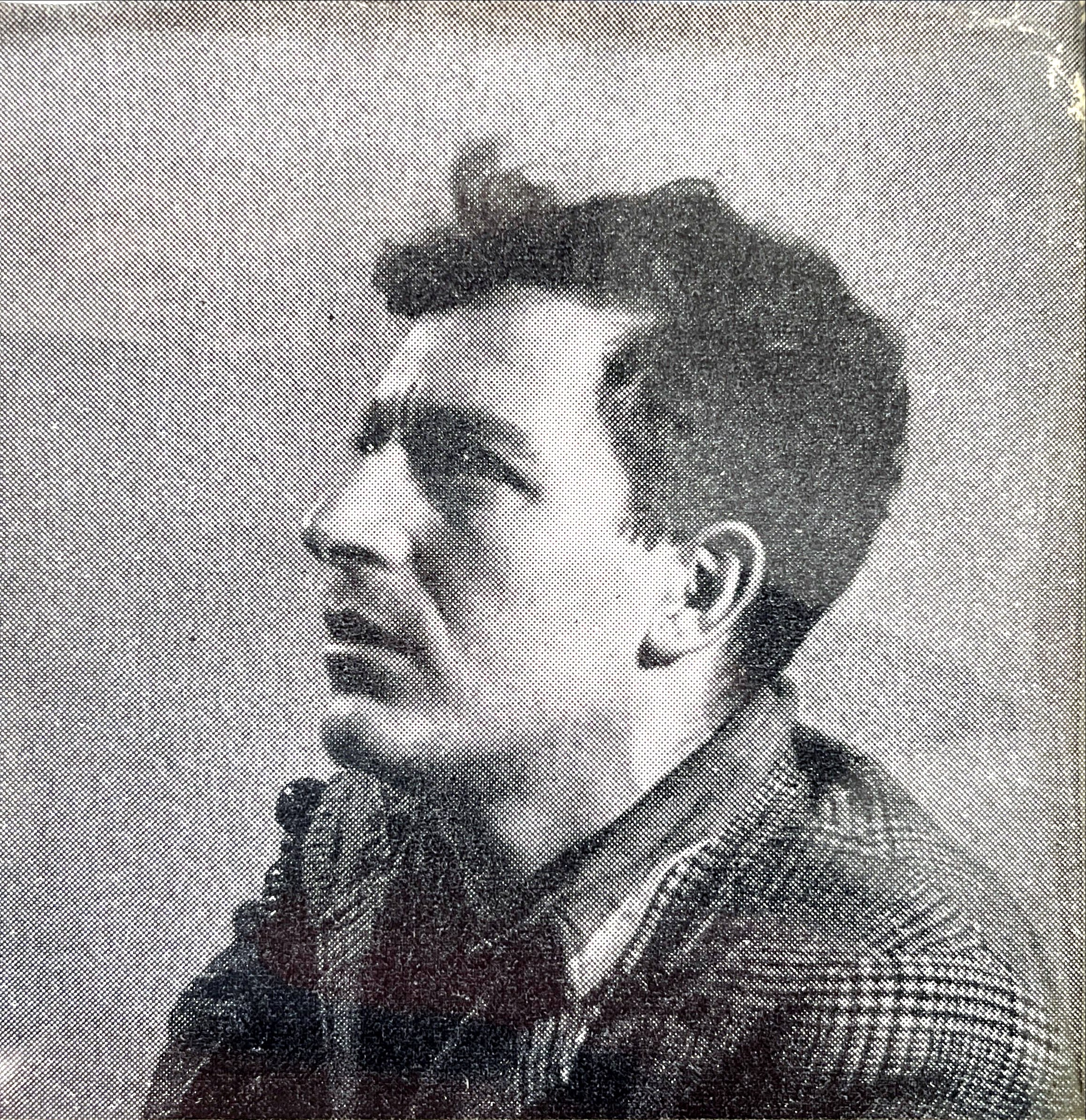
Paul Goodman during the late 1940s

== Bibliography ==
- Belgrad, Daniel (1999). "Gestalt". The Culture of Spontaneity: Improvisation and the Arts in Postwar America. University of Chicago Press. ISBN 978-0-226-04190-2.
- Chappell, Joan (1976). "Book Reviews: Gestalt Therapy by Frederick Perls, Ralph Hofferline and Paul Goodman". International Journal of Social Psychiatry. 22 (4): 310. doi:10.1177/002076407602200412. ISSN 0020-7640.
- Frank, Jerome D. (1952). "Review of Gestalt Therapy. Excitement and Growth in the Human Personality". The Quarterly Review of Biology. 27 (4): 431. doi:10.1086/399270. ISSN 0033-5770. JSTOR 2809536.
- Keel, John S. (1968). "Gestalt Therapy as a Nonaristotelian System". ETC: A Review of General Semantics. 25 (2): 248–254. ISSN 0014-164X. JSTOR 42574441.
- Levine, George (February 18, 1973). "Paul Goodman, Outsider Looking In". The New York Times Book Review. pp. 4–6. ISSN 0362-4331. ProQuest 119671494.
- Luchins, Abraham S. (1953). "Review of Gestalt Therapy: Excitement and Growth in the Human Personality". The American Journal of Psychology. 66 (1): 165–166. doi:10.2307/1417998. ISSN 0002-9556. JSTOR 1417998.
- Marmor, Judd (1966). "Review of Gestalt Therapy: Excitement and Growth in the Human Personality". Philosophy and Phenomenological Research. 26 (4): 597–598. doi:10.2307/2106229. ISSN 0031-8205. JSTOR 2106229.
- Philippson, Peter (2016). "Paul Goodman and the Gestalt theory of self". Self & Society. 44 (4): 327–332. doi:10.1080/03060497.2016.1249123. ISSN 0306-0497 – via Taylor & Francis.
- Redfearn, J. W. T. (January 1974). "Gestalt therapy (Book)". Journal of Analytical Psychology. 19 (1): 115–116. ISSN 0021-8774. EBSCOhost 10844111.
- Stoehr, Taylor (1994). Here Now Next: Paul Goodman and the Origins of Gestalt Therapy. San Francisco: Jossey-Bass. ISBN 978-0-7879-0005-2. OCLC 30029013.
- —— (March 2009). "Perls, Hefferline, and Goodman: Gestalt Therapy – An Afterword". Gestalt Review. 13 (1): 82–95. doi:10.5325/gestaltreview.13.1.0082. ISSN 1084-8657. S2CID 148813609.
- Wagshal, Harry (1974). "Education and the 'New Consciousness' Literature". Comparative Education Review. 18 (1): 129–133. doi:10.1086/445760. ISSN 0010-4086. JSTOR 1186122. S2CID 147453167.
- "Gestalt Therapy". Journal of Clinical Psychology. 8 (2): 213–214. April 1952. doi:10.1002/1097-4679(195204)8:2<213::AID-JCLP2270080228>3.0.CO;2-W. ISSN 0021-9762.
