= Topdog vs. underdog =

Topdog vs. underdog is a phrase coined by Fritz Perls, the father of Gestalt therapy, to describe a self-torture game that people play with themselves in order to avoid the anxiety that they encounter in their environment.

== Description ==
The topdog describes the part of an individual which makes demands based on the idea that the individual should adhere to certain societal norms and standards. These demands are often characterized by "shoulds" and "oughts".

The underdog describes the part of an individual which makes excuses explaining why these demands should not be met. It is often the case that these excuses act as internal sabotage to ensure that the demands are never met.

The topdog and underdog intersect in oneself and the relationship is very dynamic. The topdog gets more powerful as well as frustrated as the underdog begins to get more resistant. To get out of the cyclical nature of the topdog vs. underdog relationship, the topdog needs to move from "shoulds" to being more personable. The underdog must open up more in its resistance while taking responsibility.

Gestalt therapists often guide their patients through an exercise where the patients takes on both of these roles. With the guidance of the therapist, the patients can come to gain insight about themselves which can help them have a healthier relationship with their environment.

=== References ===
- The Gestalt Center of Gainesville, Inc.
