= Miriam Polster =

Clinical psycholgist

Miriam Polster (July 7, 1924–December 19, 2001) was a clinical psychologist who was raised in Cleveland, Ohio, United States of America. Polster had an interest in music, which happened to be her undergraduate major and a subject she integrated into her work. Once reaching graduate school, she became an advocate for Gestalt therapy; a therapy aimed towards self-awareness. Polster was the co-founder of The Gestalt Training Centre. Polster was the co-author of two books on Gestalt therapy theory (Gestalt Therapy Integrated and From the Radical Centre), and the sole author of Eve’s Daughters. Miriam Polster died due to cancer, in 2001.

== Early life ==
Miriam Polster was born Miriam Friedman on July 7, 1924, to Aaron Friedman and Minnie Rachbuch, a Jewish family in Cleveland, Ohio. Polster's family was consistently described as being loving and supportive of Polster's aspirations. Her father worked for the U.S. Postal Service at the time of the Great Depression, despite having a degree in law. Her mother was a housewife. Polster had one brother who was five years older than her, Larry.

== Career ==
Polster's initial passion was music. She attended Miami University and completed her bachelor's degree in music in 1946. She did additional studies at the Cleveland Institute of Music in regard to vocal performance.

Miriam Polster met Erving Polster in 1949, and the two were married in October. They have two children, Adam and Sarah. Both children had poor health as Adam had cerebral palsy and Sarah died from colon cancer in July 2001.

In 1953, the Gestalt Institute of Cleveland was founded by key figures in the history of Gestalt theory, including Fritz Perls, Laura Perls, Isadore From, and Paul Goodman. Her husband, Erving Polster, was among the founding faculty members, and his involvement in workshops that trained individuals in new Gestalt therapeutic techniques piqued her interest in psychology. Polster went back to school and received her doctorate in clinical psychology from Case Western Reserve University in 1967.

== Theory ==
Gestalt therapy is an experiential and humanistic approach that aims to develop self-knowledge, acceptance, and growth. One aspect of therapy is establishing contact with the environment and self through our sensory organs which is essential to healthy development. Polster and her husband Erving Polster are responsible for furthering the development of the concept of contact-boundary. Boundaries function to help people to connect to their environment and withdraw from it when necessary. A disturbance of these boundaries can result in confluence, isolation, retroflection, introjection, projection, and deflection. Confluence refers to losing the boundary between self and others which is on the opposite spectrum of isolation in which the boundary becomes impermeable and connection to others is lost. Retroflection is restraining parts of your self from being expressed. Introjection is the passive acceptance of other people's ideas. Projection refers to attributing parts of self onto others and Deflection is the fear of conflict. All of these disturbances can fluctuate between healthy and unhealthy depending on your level of awareness.

== Literature ==
=== 1973: Gestalt Therapy Integrated: Contours of Theory and Practice ===
Gestalt Therapy Integrated is the first book on Gestalt therapy theory written by Erving and Miriam Polster. The Polsters wanted their book to serve as an extensive overview of Gestalt theory and therapeutic techniques, a textbook on the practices of Gestalt. In addition, Erving wanted to include personal interpretations of wider Gestalt theory and incorporated his own theories, including contact-boundary. Polster did not contribute a large part of her own theories and interpretations, but she aided Erving by discussing concepts in his theories with him that had been developed through his teachings and workshops at the Gestalt Institute of Cleveland. The book is regarded by many scholars and students as a comprehensive introduction to Gestalt therapy.

=== 1992: Eve’s Daughters: The Forbidden Heroism of Women ===
Eve’s Daughters is a work of non-fiction that Miriam Polster wrote alone. It emphasizes women's abilities to be heroes in a world that views heroism as a male dominated role. Polster explains that heroism appears in different forms. Polster mentions that the trend of gender roles, places limits to the potential of everyone. Eve’s Daughters exemplifies the discrepancies of the male and female gender through the story of Eve, and the story of Prometheus. Prometheus stole fire from the Gods and received punishment. After sanction, Prometheus was seen viewed as a brave and likeable character. In the story of Eve, she had eaten an apple despite being told otherwise by God. Unlike Prometheus, Eve is disciplined and perceived as an unlikable and disobedient figure. Polster points out that, in a sense, Eve leads a wave of women making their own decisions on how they live because of her choice not to follow an unrationalized command. Furthermore, Eve’s Daughters maintains, Eve's story provides lessons used today (i.e. the concept of consequences following our actions).

=== 1999: From the Radical Centre: The Heart of Gestalt Therapy ===
From the Radical Center: The Heart of Gestalt Therapy is a collection of essays written by Miriam and Erving Polster. It is a collection of their selected writings that covers the history of psychotherapy touching on theoretical and practical applications. The novel first sets the stage by describing the principles of Gestalt therapy, illustrating the application and transformation of the theories. They then discuss the role and implications of the community on the individual. Various aspects of theory and therapy are integrated in this novel to encompass the full spectrum of psychotherapy.

== Legacy ==
Miriam Polster and her husband Erving Polster started out by running couple and family workshops. They led groups together but did not do so in their own fields as much. Miriam and Erving Polster founded the Gestalt Training Centre in San Diego, California. They taught and trained many professionals in Gestalt therapy all around the world. Literature stated that they were known as some of the most influential Gestalt therapists, and their training inspired others to take on Gestalt therapy training themselves.

Polster was also a member of the faculty of the Gestalt Institute in Cleveland, Ohio. She was involved with the Institute before and after she was a graduate student and was present at many workshops.

== Death ==
In 1994, Polster was diagnosed with, and survived, both breast cancer and endometrial cancer; she died on December 19, 2001, at the age of 77 after a relapse in the endometrial cancer.
