= Erving Polster =

Czech psychologist (1922–2024)

Erving Polster (13 April 1922 – 22 March 2024) was a Czech psychologist who was a pioneer in Gestalt Therapy.

== Biography ==
Polster born on April 13, 1922, in Czechoslovakia. He received his Ph.D. from Western Reserve University in 1950 where his early orientation was psychoanalytic. He first encountered Gestalt therapy in 1953. He subsequently joined the newly formed Gestalt Institute of Cleveland in Cleveland, Ohio and became its chairman in 1958. He later co-founded the Gestalt Training Center in San Diego, California. He wrote or co-wrote seven books on Gestalt therapy, including Gestat Therapy Integrated. His first wife was psychologist Miriam Polster. They married in 1949 and moved to La Jolla, California in 1973. Miriam died in 2001, and he married his second wife Rose Lee in 2006. Polster retired from private practice in 1998, but continued writing and consulting work in psychology. Polster died on 22 March 2024, at the age of 101.
