= Jim Simkin =

American psychologist (1919–1984)

- Jim Simkin in Big Sur, 1981
- Born: 1919; Winnipeg, Manitoba, Canada
- Died: 1984 (aged 64–65); Big Sur, California
- Education: University of Michigan
- Occupation: psychologist

James Solomon Simkin (1919–1984) was an early seminal figure in the history of Gestalt Therapy.

== Biography ==
Simkin received his doctorate in Clinical Psychology at the University of Michigan, and practiced in New Jersey. He also was Chief Psychologist at a large VA hospital. Like most psychotherapists of his generation he was trained analytically. After working in therapy with Fritz Perls in the early 1950s, Simkin became enamored of the Gestalt approach, training and then doing co-therapy with Fritz. Later, he moved with his family to Southern California and started a therapy practice in Beverly Hills. He invited Perls to join him, but the sharing of an office was short-lived—Perls' volatility and Simkin's hyper-orderly style didn't mix too well vis a vis sharing an office (Simkin, personal communication, 1980). Perls discovered the Esalen Institute and began doing gestalt workshops and trainings there. Perls and Simkin joined in leading training groups in gestalt therapy for professionals at the institute. Later, when a 5-acre (20,000 m^{2}) parcel on the coast just north of Esalen became available, Simkin built a striking home on the property and started his own residential training institute there in 1969. (Perls left Esalen in 1968).

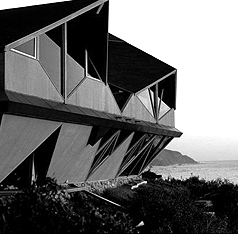
Simkin Training Center, Big Sur, 1975

Simkin's style was more methodical and less flashy than Perls' as could be inferred from his training program. Training consisted of a minimum of three residential months over a three- to five-year period. During the first year, trainees worked exclusively on their own self-awareness and observed their mentor in action in groups and individual sessions. During subsequent years they were able to work individually or in group with "patient models" who had to be referred by an outside therapist. All this work was supervised in vivo, and all work was videotaped for study. Simkin brought in world-famous trainers for two-day stints during the training month, so as to expose his trainees to different styles of doing Gestalt Therapy, and hopefully prevent them from aping his own style. This was seen as essential to the approach by Simkin. Visiting trainers included Lore Perls, Isadore From, Daniel Rosenblatt, Bob Martin, Miriam Polster, Erv Polster, and others.

Simkin worked much in the manner of Perls, however, in that little attention was paid to group process. The work was done in the Perlsian hot-seat fashion, with the client interacting with the therapist and the therapist using the group as a foil. However, the residential model gave clients an opportunity to practice new behaviors in a family-like setting.

Simkin was a master at observing and tracking behavior, and at contriving interventions that struck to the core of his patients' issues. His use of paradox, his powerful personal presence, and his ability to zero in relentlessly on core issues were his trademarks. He also had an ability to find and appreciate the authentic core of his patients' personalities, and he used confrontation very effectively. Simkin walked the walk with his relentless commitment to being his own person and enabling others to find out and respect their own personhood. He is one of the early Gestalt therapists who took much from Martin Buber's emphasis on the I-thou relationship.

Much sought after as a trainer, Simkin's program attracted trainees from all over the world. Simkin also traveled to do trainings in Germany, Italy, New Zealand, Australia, the Netherlands, and throughout the United States. In 1981 he became ill with leukemia but continued working until his death in 1984. Simkin's Big Sur home and training center was acquired by and became part of The Esalen Institute in 2009.
