= Introjection =

Psychological process

In psychology, introjection (often mistakenly considered a substitute for the terms identification or internalization) is the unconscious adoption of the thoughts, memories or personality traits of others. It occurs as a normal part of development, such as a child taking on parental values and attitudes. It can also be a defense mechanism in situations that arouse anxiety. It has been associated with both normal and pathological development. In sociology and other social sciences, internalization (or internalisation) means an individual's acceptance of a set of norms and values (established by others) through socialisation.

== Theory ==
Introjection is a concept rooted in the psychoanalytic theories of unconscious motivations. Unconscious motivation refers to processes in the mind which occur automatically and bypass conscious examination and considerations.

Introjection is the learning process or in some cases a defense mechanism where a person unconsciously absorbs experiences and makes them part of their psyche.

=== In learning ===
In psychoanalysis, introjection (German: Introjektion) refers to an unconscious process wherein one takes components of another person's identity, such as feelings, experiences and cognitive functioning, and transfers them inside themselves, making such experiences part of their new psychic structure. These components are obliterated from consciousness (splitting), perceived in someone else (projection), and then experienced and performed (i.e., introjected) by that other person. Cognate concepts are identification, incorporation and internalization.

=== As a defense mechanism ===
It is considered a self-stabilizing defense mechanism used when there is a lack of full psychological contact between a child and the adults providing that child's psychological needs. In other words, it provides the illusion of maintaining relationship but at the expense of a loss of self. To use a simple example, a person who picks up traits from their friends is introjecting.

Another straightforward illustration could be a youngster who is being bullied at school. Unknowingly adopting the bully's behavior, the victim youngster may do so to stop being picked on in the future.

Projection has been described as an early phase of introjection.

== Historic precursors ==
=== Freud and Klein ===
In Freudian terms, introjection is the aspect of the ego's system of relational mechanisms which handles checks and balances from a perspective external to what one normally considers 'oneself', infolding these inputs into the internal world of the self-definitions, where they can be weighed and balanced against one's various senses of externality. For example:

- "When a child envelops representational images of his absent parents into himself, simultaneously fusing them with his own personality."
- "Individuals with weak ego boundaries are more prone to use introjection as a defense mechanism."

According to D. W. Winnicott, "projection and introjection mechanisms... let the other person be the manager sometimes, and to hand over omnipotence."

According to Freud, the ego and the superego are constructed by introjecting external behavioural patterns into the subject's own person. Specifically, he maintained that the critical agency or the superego could be accounted for in terms of introjection and that the superego derives from the parents or other figures of authority. The derived behavioural patterns are not necessarily reproductions as they actually are but incorporated or introjected versions of them.

=== Torok and Ferenczi ===
However, the aforementioned description of introjection has been challenged by Maria Torok as she favours using the term as it is employed by Sándor Ferenczi in his essay "The Meaning of Introjection" (1912). In this context, introjection is an extension of autoerotic interests that broadens the ego by a lifting of repression so that it includes external objects in its make-up. Torok defends this meaning in her 1968 essay "The Illness of Mourning and the Fantasy of the Exquisite Corpse", where she argues that Sigmund Freud and Melanie Klein confuse introjection with incorporation and that Ferenczi's definition remains crucial to analysis. She emphasized that in failed mourning "the impotence of the process of introjection (gradual, slow, laborious, mediated, effective)" means that "incorporation is the only choice: fantasmatic, unmediated, instantaneous, magical, sometimes hallucinatory...'crypt' effects (of incorporation)".

=== Fritz and Laura Perls ===
In Gestalt therapy, the concept of "introjection" is not identical with the psychoanalytical concept. Central to Fritz and Laura Perls' modifications was the concept of "dental or oral aggression", when the infant develops teeth and is able to chew. They set "introjection" against "assimilation". In Ego, Hunger and Aggression, Fritz and Laura Perls suggested that when the infant develops teeth, he or she has the capacity to chew, to break apart food, and assimilate it, in contrast to swallowing before; and by analogy to experience, to taste, accept, reject or assimilate. Laura Perls explains: "I think Freud said that development takes place through introjection, but if it remains introjection and goes no further, then it becomes a block; it becomes identification."

Thus Fritz and Laura Perls made "assimilation", as opposed to "introjection", a focal theme in Gestalt therapy and in their work, and the prime means by which growth occurs in therapy. In contrast to the psychoanalytic stance, in which the "patient" introjects the (presumably more healthy) interpretations of the analyst, in Gestalt therapy the client must "taste" with awareness their experience, and either accept or reject it, but not introject or "swallow whole". Hence, the emphasis is on avoiding interpretation, and instead encouraging discovery. This is the key point in the divergence of Gestalt therapy from traditional psychoanalysis: growth occurs through gradual assimilation of experience in a natural way, rather than by accepting the interpretations of the analyst.

== See also ==
- Internalization (sociology)
- Internalized oppression
- Internalizing disorder
- Labeling theory
- Suggestion
