= Gestalt practice =

Psychological practice

Richard "Dick" Price

Gestalt practice is a contemporary form of personal exploration and integration developed by Dick Price at the Esalen Institute. The objective of the practice is to become more fully aware of the process of living within a unified field of body, mind, relationship, earth and spirit.

The term gestalt comes from the psychological theory of the same name, which stressed that human perception was based on patterns. Fritz Perls, Laura Perls and Paul Goodman later applied the term to a type of therapy which focused on experience and context. Dick Price's Gestalt practice was partially based on the Gestalt therapy which Perls and others created.

Alan Watts, who was a mentor of Price, suggested combining practices from the cultures of East and West. Price took the writings of Nyanaponika Thera and Zen Roshi Shunryū Suzuki, abbot of the nearby Tassajara Zen Mountain Center, as sources of Buddhist meditation practice. Gestalt practice was the term Price used to describe his combination of these Eastern and Western traditions. This term distinguished the practice Price taught from both Gestalt therapy and Buddhist practice.

== Practice, not therapy ==
Gestalt practice distinguishes itself as an awareness practice rather than a form of therapy because it does not purport to cure any psychological symptoms. Keeping with this distinction, it does not employ the roles of patient and therapist. Instead, it relies upon the interaction between two equal partners, namely an initiator of awareness work and a reflector. As Dick Price conceived of Gestalt practice, if a patient wants to do Gestalt work with a therapist then they belong in Gestalt therapy.

However, some aspects of Gestalt practice are derived from the theory of Gestalt therapy. Gestalt practice incorporates some typical Gestalt awareness experiments borrowed from the Gestalt therapy model, along with eclectic techniques of meditation, physical exercise, environmentalism, contemplation, and spiritual practice.

== Inception ==
Gestalt practice is an amalgam of awareness practices. Lao Tzu was one of the most significant Asian influences on Price. Otherwise, the primary influences on the development of Gestalt practice were Fritz Perls, Wilhelm Reich, Alan Watts, Nyanaponika Thera, Shunryu Suzuki, Frederic Spiegelberg, Rajneesh, Joseph Campbell, Gregory Bateson, and Stanislav Grof, as well as many other scholars who were in residence at Esalen Institute during the two decades that Price led the institute.

Price worked with Perls for approximately four years at Esalen, between 1966 and 1970. Then Perls told Price that it was time for him to start teaching Gestalt on his own. Price was impressed with the similarities between Gestalt and mindfulness meditation, which he used with insights from Eastern religions and altered state research to develop Gestalt practice.

== Modalities ==
Gestalt practitioners teach mindfulness skills, using a wide variety of methods not limited by the psychotherapeutic model. (Note: For examples of the types of practices that might be used in Gestalt practice, see Goldman, Marion S. The American Soul Rush: Esalen and the Rise of Spiritual Privilege. New York University Press (2012) Appendix I.) All Gestalt practice techniques emphasize experience over analysis. Besides the standard Gestalt exercises that characterized Gestalt therapy, Dick Price widened the approach by incorporating novel techniques from such disciplines as meditation, shamanism, compassion practice, and spiritual contemplation. (Note: Compare contemporary meditation practices such as Mettā and Tonglen, typically used in Gestalt practice, with earlier forms of discourse found in: Perls, F. Gestalt Therapy Verbatim. Moab, UT: Real People Press (1969); Polster, E. & Polster, M. Gestalt Therapy Integrated: Contours of theory and practice, New York, NY: Brunner-Mazel (1973); Stevens, J. O. Awareness: exploring, experimenting, experiencing. Moab, UT: Real People Press ( 1971).) Thus, Gestalt practice became a personalized form of consciousness exploration beyond the limits of psychotherapy. A partial list of the modalities used in Gestalt practice includes the following:

Gestalt practice work may involve the reporting of present awareness, and the integration of awareness through intrapsychic dialogue between aspects of personality. This kind of work, borrowed from Gestalt therapy, is often practiced as a shared experiment between two partners working together as a "dyad." Phenomenological techniques like these are based upon the belief that subjective experience is worthy of direct attention, without the interference of preexisting ideas or interpretations.

Somatic awareness may be the focus of Gestalt exercises. Awareness of breathing is emphasized because it promotes the immediate experience of the body. Dramatic interventions, typical of body-oriented Reichian therapy or bioenergetics, generally are not used in Gestalt practice. However, an initiator's awareness naturally may be directed toward areas of tension or holding. A scan of body feelings and sensations, similar to forms of Buddhist meditation can enhance awareness practice. And movement exercises such as tai chi, yoga, dance, art, hiking, chanting, singing, and massage may be used to integrate awareness of the body.

Interpersonal relationship practices may be used in Gestalt practice to clarify communications, improve relationship skills, and enhance empathy. A neutral moderator may assist with interpersonal encounters, although this is not necessary, in keeping with the Gestalt practice principle of equality among participants.

Dreamwork is a common Gestalt awareness practice, in which enactment and integration of dream elements are favored. An initiator of Gestalt dreamwork intentionally re-experiences their dream as if it were happening in the present. The initiator then assumes the role of various dream elements and enters into a dialogue with whatever is encountered in the dream. This approach is borrowed from the Gestalt therapy model. However, in contrast to Gestalt therapy, alternative sources of dream interpretation, including intuitive experiences are welcomed in Gestalt practice.

Meditation practices, derived from many different contemplative traditions, may be used by Gestalt practitioners. Buddhism provides many useful models for mindfulness and compassion practice, and some of these have been adapted to complement the objectives of Gestalt practice.

Taoism, as it was expressed by Lao Tzu in the Tao Te Ching, provides a non-judgmental backdrop for non-intervention with an initiator's process, allowing whatever happens in a Gestalt work session to unfold naturally in the present moment. In addition, Taoism reinforces the reverence for nature that is typical of Gestalt practice.

These techniques, and many others beyond the ambit of therapy, are regularly used in Gestalt practice, with the same objectives of enhanced awareness, spiritual growth, and respect for the natural environment.

== Deployment ==
Gestalt practice is most often taught in groups, with an experienced reflector serving as group leader. However, after participants have learned the basics of Gestalt, they frequently choose to do awareness practice work together on their own, outside of a group, without a leader. In this way, a Gestalt practice group functions as the model for a Gestalt community. Gestalt practice, as Price conceived it, quickly evolves into a congregational awareness practice that transcends the confines of any meeting room.

Price led Gestalt groups at Esalen for fifteen years until his death in 1985. His wife and collaborator at Esalen, Christine Stewart Price, carried on the Gestalt practice tradition by developing her own form of awareness practice, which she calls "Gestalt Awareness Practice" (GAP), and she continues to lead these sessions in her own organization, Tribal Ground Circle.

Gestalt practice influenced many people at Esalen.
