= George Levine =

American professor of English literature (born 1931)

- Born: August 27, 1931 (age 94); New York City, U.S.
- Occupation: English literature professor

George Levine (born 1931) is an American professor of English literature who spent his career at Rutgers University.

== Biography ==
George Levine was born August 27, 1931, in New York City. He received his bachelor's degree from New York University in 1952 and his master's and Ph.D. from the University of Minnesota in 1953 and 1959, respectively. He served in the U.S. Army from 1953 through 1955. After working as an instructor and professor at Indiana University, Bloomington, from 1959 through 1968, he moved to Rutgers University, where he taught from 1985 through his retirement in 2006. He occupied the named chair Kenneth Burke Professor of English for his last two decades there.

== Selected works ==
- Darwin the Writer (2011)
- How to Read the Victorian Novel (2008)
- Darwin Loves You: Natural Selection and the Re-enchantment of the World (2006)
- Dying to Know: Scientific Epistemology and Narrative in Victorian England (2002)
- An Annotated Critical Bibliography of George Eliot (1988)
- Darwin and the Novelists: Patterns of Science in Nineteenth-Century Fiction (1988)
- The Realistic Imagination: English Fiction from Frankenstein to Lady Chatterley (1981)
- The Boundaries of Fiction: Carlyle, Macaulay, Newman (1968)
