= Ian Ward (musician) =

American musician (born 1996)

- Born: Ian Ward Brininstool; 1996 (age 29–30); La Jolla, California, U.S.
- Genres: musical theatre; pop; rock
- Occupations: Actor; singer; songwriter; musician; composer
- Instruments: Vocals; guitar
- Years active: 2005–present
- Label: Mutual Street Entertainment
- Website: ianwardoutward.com

Ian Ward (Ian Ward Brininstool) is an actor, singer, songwriter, and musician. He has starred in Rock of Ages, Rent, Catch Me If You Can, and the Lifetime TV movie, Bad Tutor, among others. He has performed with artists such as Adam Lambert, Cynthia Erivo, Josh Gad, John Stamos, Idina Menzel, and Phillipa Soo, and worked with Cyndi Lauper and Pat Benatar in theatre productions, Working Girl and Invincible. In 2025, he auditioned on American Idol and received a "Golden Ticket" to compete in Hollywood, California as well as releasing his debut EP, One Shot.

== Early life and education ==
Ian Ward Brininstool was born in 1996 in La Jolla, California. He began singing at the age of nine in theater productions in New York and Southern California and started playing the guitar and writing songs at thirteen years old.

In 2005, at the age of nine, Ward made his professional stage debut in the title role of Oliver! at San Diego's Starlight Musical Theatre and played several roles in the Old Globe Theatre's production of Ace and How the Grinch Stole Christmas as well as portraying Edgar in Ragtime at the Starlight Musical Theatre in 2007. He played the role of Rodney in the TV series, Veronica Mars in 2005 - 2006.

In 2009, at 13 years old, Ward was named "Outstanding Young Artist," a category created specifically for Ward, by the San Diego Theatre Critics Circle for his portrayal of Rudy in the North Coast Repertory production of Over the Tavern. In August 2010, he was struck by an intoxicated motorist who had intentionally rammed his car into a group of teenagers in La Jolla, California. Ward sustained injuries including a concussion, broken leg, and bruised kidney.

Ward studied musical theatre at the University of Miami before transferring to Berklee College of Music where he majored in music business and songwriting.

== Career ==
In 2016, Ward performed in American Idiot at La Mirada Theatre in Los Angeles. In 2018, he made his Broadway debut in Getting the Band Back Together at the Belasco Theatre as well as starring in the Lifetime TV movie, Bad Tutor and Rock of Ages on Norwegian Cruise Line, among other productions. In 2019, Ward played the role of Boyd on the TV series, 9-1-1.

In 2020, Ward played the lead role of Drew in Rock of Ages in Hollywood which received favorable reviews. Entertainment Weekly wrote, "but it's Ian Ward and Callandra Olivia who give Rock of Ages its pulsing, neon-lit heart. Ward lends Drew, the show's aspiring rocker, a glimmering naivety — his winsome, natural earnestness matched by his powerful belt and soulful voice."

In 2022, he starred in Catch Me If You Can playing the lead role of Frank Abagnale, Jr., with the Ithaca Times writing, "Ward owns the role at every moment, sings splendidly, and is so amiable and polite you forget he's scamming." That same year Ward played the lead role of Roger in a nine-month production of Rent at the Oregon Shakespeare Festival, which received favorable reviews, and performed in Pat Benatar's Invincible - The Musical at the Wallis Annenberg Center for the Performing Arts in Beverly Hills. In 2023 - 2024, he played the role of Anatole in Natasha, Pierre & The Great Comet of 1812 in the US and Shanghai. Ward played the role of Roger in Rent in Concert at the Rady Shell at Jacobs Park featuring the San Diego Symphony in 2024.

In 2025, Ward auditioned on Season 23 of American Idol and won a "Gold Ticket" to compete in Hollywood, CA after receiving a "Yes" vote from judges Lionel Richie, Carrie Underwood, and Luke Bryan. That same year he performed in Jesus Christ Superstar (featuring Cynthia Erivo and Adam Lambert) at the Hollywood Bowl as well as performing in Cyndi Lauper's Working Girl at the La Jolla Playhouse. Ward released his debut EP, One Shot, on January 13, 2025 with singles "Ocean Eyes" and "You Can Do Better" receiving positive reviews.

In 2026, Ward became the lead singer of the music group, Yachtley Crew.

=== Selected Theatre Performances ===
| Year | Title | Role | Notes |
|---|---|---|---|
| 2025 | Working Girl | Mick | Cyndi Lauper and La Jolla Playhouse |
| 2025 | Jesus Christ Superstar | Apostle | Hollywood Bowl |
| 2024 | From Here to Eternity | Prewitt | Skylight Music Theatre |
| 2024 | Rent in Concert | Roger | Rady Shell at Jacobs Park |
| 2023 - 2024 | Natasha, Pierre & The Great Comet of 1812 | Anatole | US/Shanghai |
| 2023 | Rent | Roger | Oregon Shakespeare Festival |
| 2022 | Invincible | Paris | Wallis Annenberg Center for the Performing Arts |
| 2022 | Catch Me If You Can | Frank Jr. | Merry-Go-Round Playhouse |
| 2019 - 2020 | Rock of Ages | Drew | Bourbon Room (Hollywood, CA) |
| 2018 | Gettin' the Band Back Together | Ricky/Swing | Belasco Theatre |
| 2018 | Gettin' the Band Back Together | Ricky/Swing | Norwegian Cruise Line |
| 2017 - 2018 | BAZ: A Musical Mashup | Romeo | Palazzo Theatre |
| 2016 | American Idiot | Will | La Mirada Theatre |
| 2010 | Christmas Spectacular Starring the Radio City Rockettes | Patrick | Radio City Music Hall |
| 2009 | Over the Tavern | Rudy | |
| 2008 | Leap of Faith | Boyd | |
| 2005 | Oliver! | Oliver | Starlight Musical Theatre |

=== Film and TV ===
| Year | Title | Role | Notes |
|---|---|---|---|
| 2025 | American Idol | Himself | Contestant |
| 2020 | 9-1-1 | Boyd | |
| 2018 | Bad Tutor | Steve | Lifetime TV Movie |
| 2006 | Veronica Mars | Rodney | |
