= Edwin C. Nevis =

American psychotherapist (1926-2011)

Edwin C. Nevis (May 20, 1926 – May 20, 2011) was an American gestalt therapist who identified Maslow's hierarchy of needs as culturally relative and formulated a hierarchy of needs for Chinese culture and a mode of classifying hierarchies of needs in different cultures. He co-founded the Gestalt Institute of Cleveland and founded the Gestalt International Study Center, and was a faculty member in management at the MIT Sloan School of Management.

== Life and career ==
Nevis was born in Brooklyn, New York on May 20, 1926. He earned an undergraduate degree from City College of New York, a Master's from Columbia University, and a Ph.D. from Western Reserve University.

Nevis taught at the MIT Sloan School of Management for almost 17 years; he directed the Program for Senior Executives. In 1956 he was one of the founders of the Gestalt Institute of Cleveland; he was its president until 1973 and created its Organizational & System Development and International OSD programs. In 1979 he and his wife, Sonia M. Nevis, founded the Gestalt International Study Center in Wellfleet, Massachusetts; he was its president until 2007.

Nevis died of lymphoma in Wellfleet, Massachusetts on May 20, 2011, his 85th birthday.

== Theoretical contributions ==
In 1981, while teaching organization psychology in a management program in Shanghai, Nevis's observation of individuals there led him to conclude that their hierarchy of needs differed from that propounded by Abraham Maslow, which was based on American culture, and to formulate a Chinese hierarchy, Nevis's hierarchy of needs. He regarded the need hierarchies of different cultures as classifiable with reference to an individualism-collectivism dimension and an ego-social dimension.

The Gestalt International Study Center is unusual in working with couples, groups, and organizations in an experiential and not solely therapeutic manner. Nevis characterized it as a "hands-on [approach whose] goal is to create tools that will enrich our participants' lives with greater self awareness, interpersonal and professional skills."

Nevis's Organizational Consulting: A Gestalt Approach (1987) was his "signature book."

== Awards ==
In 2010, Nevis was awarded the Organization Development Network's Lifetime Achievement Award.

== Books ==
- Organizational Consulting: A Gestalt Approach. Gestalt Institute of Cleveland Press; New York: Gardner, 1987. ISBN 978-0-89876-124-5
- Gestalt Therapy: Perspectives and Applications. Gestalt Institute of Cleveland Press; New York: Gardner, 1992. ISBN 978-0-89876-143-6
- (with Anthony J DiBella) How Organizations Learn: An Integrated Strategy for Building Learning Capability. Jossey-Bass business & management series. San Francisco: Jossey-Bass, 1998. ISBN 978-0-7879-1107-2
- (with Joan E. Lancourt and Helen G. Vassallo) Intentional Revolutions: A Seven-Point Strategy for Transforming Organizations Gestalt Institute of Cleveland publications. Jossey-Bass business & management series. San Francisco: Jossey-Bass, 1996. ISBN 978-0-7879-0240-7
- (with Joseph Melnick) Mending the World: Social Healing Interventions by Gestalt Practitioners Worldwide. Gestalt International Study Center publications. Xlibris, 2009. ISBN 978-1-4415-7524-1
