= Barry Stevens (technology developer) =

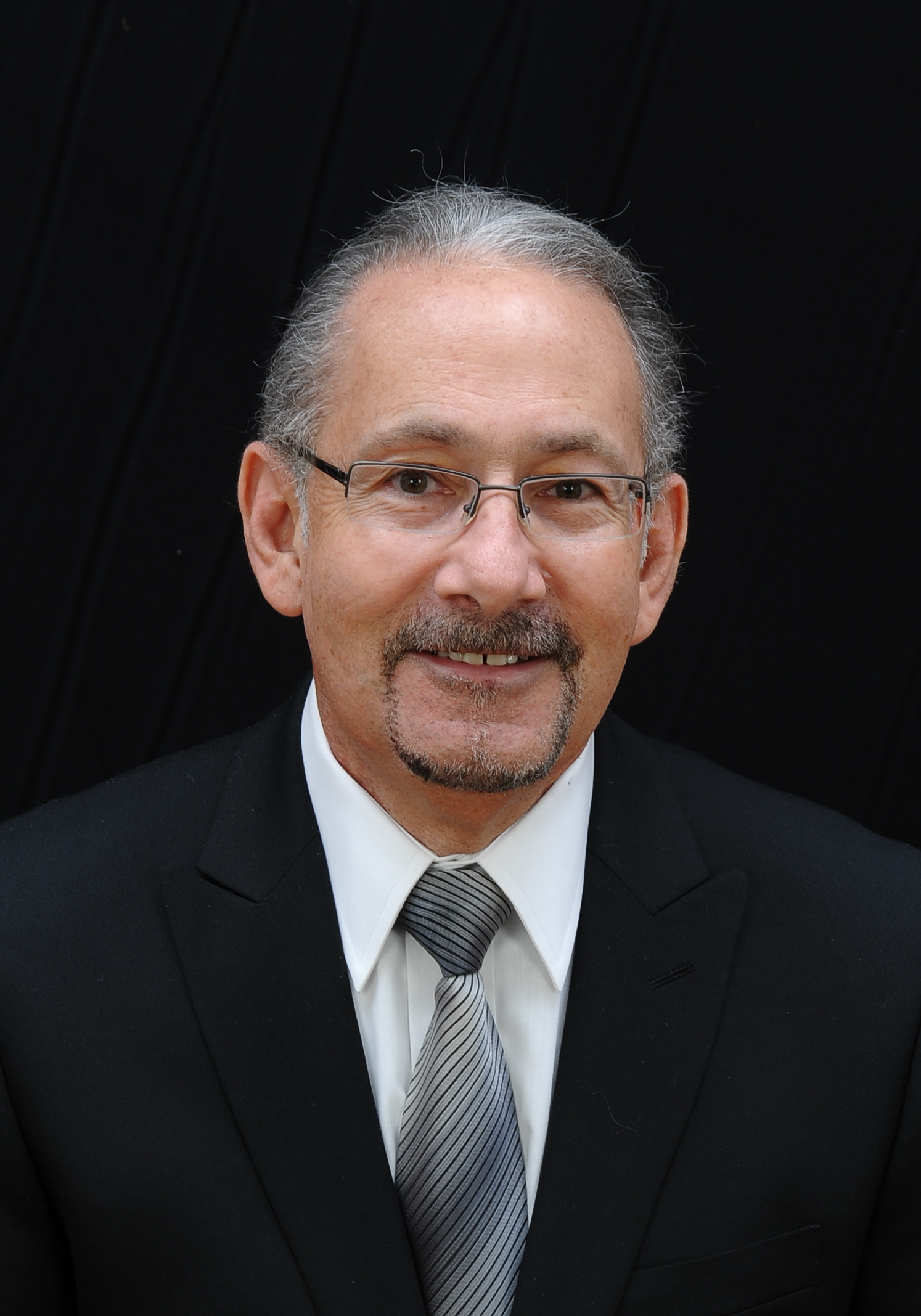
- Born: Barry Stevens; December 14, 1949 (age 76); New York, New York, United States
- Education: Ph.D. - inorganic chemistry from Rutgers University, Newark; M.S. - inorganic chemistry from Rutgers University, New Brunswick; B.S. in science (triple major: biology, chemistry, and physics) from Fairleigh Dickinson University (magna cum laude and valedictorian)
- Employer(s): Founder and president of TBD America, Inc.
- Known for: Development, commercialization and scholarship in renewable and clean energy technologies
- Board member of: PREVIOUS - Value Technology; Spectral Solar; AppleSeed Ventures; National Hydrogen Fund

Barry Stevens (born 1949) is an American technology business developer, scientist, author, speaker and entrepreneur in technology-driven enterprises; Founder of TBD America Inc., a technology business development group (1997).

== Education ==
Stevens received his Ph.D. in inorganic chemistry from Rutgers University - Newark, an M.S. in inorganic chemistry from Rutgers University - New Brunswick, and a B.S. in science (triple major: biology, chemistry, and physics) from Fairleigh Dickinson University, where he graduated magna cum laude and valedictorian.

== Career ==
Named in five U.S. patents, Barry Stevens' history in business, science and technology can be traced from 1978 involvement in developing the VideoDisc at RCA and CBS Records, through years at Eastman Kodak (1984–1989), receiving their Office of Innovation "Recognition Award" two years in a row (1986–1987), through current renewable energy efforts and scholarship in renewable and clean energy technologies, including involvement in biofuel development with DuBay Biofuel (DuBay Ingredients LLC) and renewable energy business development with TBD America, Inc.

== Patents ==
- Stephen Van Noy, Robert Hambleton and Barry Stevens, Intraocular Lens Folder, US Patent No. 5,290,293 (1994).
- Graham D. Barrett and Barry Stevens, Bicomposite Intraocular Lenses, US Patent No. 5,211,662 (1993).
- F.R. Nyman, B. Stevens, and L. Ekstrom, Drying Process for VideoDiscs, US Patent No. 4,383,961 (1983).
- B. Stevens and L.R. Aldridge, Apparatus and Method for Cleaning Recorded Discs, US Patent No. 4,375,992 (1982).
- F.R. Nyman, B. Stevens, and J.A. Calamari, High Density Information Disc Processing, US Patent No. 4,327,048, (1982).
