= Barry Stevens (cricketer) =

Australian cricketer

Personal information
- Born: 5 November 1929 (age 97); Melbourne, Australia

Domestic team information
- Years: Team
- 1957-1958: Victoria
- Source: Cricinfo, 3 December 2015

Barry Stevens (born 5 November 1929) is an Australian former cricketer. He played five first-class cricket matches for Victoria between 1957 and 1958. He also played for Melbourne Cricket Club and scored 96 runs for that club in the premiership final of 1949.

== See also ==
- List of Victoria first-class cricketers
