= Barry Stevens (therapist) =

American Gestalt therapist (1902–1985)

Barry Stevens wrote 3 books, and collaborated with other writers and doctors.

Barry Stevens (1902–1985) was an American writer and Gestalt therapist. She developed her own form of Gestalt therapy body work, based on the awareness of body processes. For the Human Potential Movement of the 1970s, she became a kind of "star", but she always refused to accept that role.

She worked with, among others, the psychotherapists Fritz Perls and Carl Rogers. Bertrand Russell and Aldous Huxley were among her friends. Fritz Perls described Barry Stevens as "a natural born therapist."

== Life ==
Stevens was born Mildred Fox. She later changed her name from "Mildred" to "Barry." She was married to the pediatrician Albert Mason Stevens, who co-discovered Stevens–Johnson syndrome.

Barry Stevens was a self-described "High School drop-out, 1918, because what she wanted to know, she couldn't learn in school." She and her husband moved to Hawai'i in 1934. Before Albert Mason Stevens's death in 1945, Barry moved to the mainland. She worked at Orme Ranch School near Prescott, AZ, and from 1948 to 1951 she was an administrative aide at Deep Springs College, near Big Pine, California. She later worked as an editor in Albuquerque, New Mexico, then relocated to California.

Barry Stevens is the mother of Judith Sande Stevens (1925-2011) and John O. Stevens (1935-2018) who was also a writer, Gestalt therapist and NLP-trainer, known as Steve Andreas.

== Publications ==
Her publications include Don't Push the River (It Flows by Itself), a first-person account of Stevens' investigations of Gestalt therapy. It shows the author during a period of several months in association with Fritz Perls at Perls' Gestalt Institute of Canada at Lake Cowichan, Vancouver Island, in 1969. Barry Stevens describes both Gestalt therapy theory and practice and her relationship with Fritz Perls in a sensitive way, thus creating a vivid image of Perls in the last months of his life.

In addition she explored Zen Buddhism, the philosophy of Jiddu Krishnamurti, and Indian American religious practices in an effort "to deepen and expand personal experience and work through difficulties." Alternating with episodes from her earlier days, it became a "best-seller" in the circles of humanistic psychology. "We have to turn ourselves upside down and reverse our approach to life."

Her earliest published work was "Hide-away Island" (1934) a loosely autobiographical novel about a woman on the far end of Long Island.

She met Nakata Yoshimatsu, a former valet of Jack London, in Hawai'i in the 1930s, and helped him to write down his recollections. She also wrote an article about Nakata that was published posthumously in 2000.

== Bibliography ==
- Hide-away Island, Barry Fox. New York, Greenberg, 1934.
- Person to Person: The Problem of Being Human, by Carl Rogers and Barry Stevens, with contributions from Eugene Gendlin, John M. Shlien, and Wilson Van Dusen, Real People Press, 1967, ISBN 0-911226-01-X (paper) and ISBN 0-911226-00-1 (cloth).
- Don't Push the River (It Flows by Itself), Real People Press, 1970.
- Body Work, in: Gestalt is, John O. Stevens ed., Real People Press, 1975, p. 157 - 184, ISBN 0-911226-15-X pbk.
- Burst Out Laughing, Barry Stevens, Celestrial Arts, 1985.
- Nakata - Son of Jack London, in: Jack London Journal, No 7, 2000, p. 9 - 25. (published posthumously)
