= Ralph Hefferline =

American psychology professor (1910–1974)

Ralph Franklin Hefferline (15 February 1910 in Muncie, Indiana – 16 March 1974) was a psychology professor at Columbia University.

Hefferline became a patient of Fritz Perls around 1946. He joined a small training group led by Perls in 1948 in New York, and went on to contribute a chapter to the book which defined Gestalt Therapy, Gestalt Therapy, Excitement and Growth in the Human Personality, co-authored by Perls, Paul Goodman and Hefferline, published in 1951. He was the third and junior author and provided the section containing practical exercises.

He went on to join the Behaviourist school of psychology.
