= Laura Perls =

German-born psychologist (1905–1990

Laura Perls (née Lore Posner; 15 August 1905 – 13 July 1990) was a German-Jewish psychologist and psychotherapist. She is most notable for developing the Gestalt therapy approach in collaboration with her husband and fellow psychotherapist Fritz Perls and the public intellectual Paul Goodman.

== Life and work ==
Lore was born in Pforzheim in 1905, the oldest of three siblings to a wealthy merchant family. Her mother came from an upper-middle class background, while her father had lower middle class roots and ran a successful jewellery business with his brother. Lore had two younger siblings, a sister (born 1907, murdered in Theresienstadt Ghetto in 1944) and a brother (born 1909, died 1996 in USA).

Lore's upbringing was strongly influenced by her mother's class background and her father's wealth. The large family home was equipped with full-time cooks, maids and a governess. In addition to this, Lore was instructed in dance and moving lessons from age 8, received ballet lessons at her private girls' school, and developed a keen interest in literature from a young age. She began playing the piano at age 5, demonstrated professional mastery by the time she was 18 and at various points considered becoming a professional musician. Later in life, she would integrate music and dance into her therapeutic practice.

Lore became interested in social and political issues at age 15 following a mental breakdown. Worried about their daughter's wellbeing, Lore's parents had pressured her first boyfriend – who was twelve years her senior – to end the relationship. He eventually conceded, which led to Lore losing trust in her parents and significantly damaging her relationship with them. Her subsequent mental breakdown concluded in a several-month stay in a clinic in Freudenstadt, where she received psychoanalytical treatment from Dr Bauer, who based his approach on Alfred Adler's theories. During her time in the clinic, she made important connections with fellow patients whom she made music with and who also influenced her to study law at university. She also read Freud's The Interpretation of Dreams and The Psychopathology of Everyday Life during this time. Upon her return to school seven months later, she was no longer one of the best students in class but instead showed great interest in social and political issues. She gave up the goal of becoming a pianist and instead began harbouring ambitions of studying and working in a socially engaged field.

By 1923, Laura began studying law in Frankfurt but eventually switched to psychology and philosophy in 1926. Amongst others, she was taught by Max Wertheimer, Kurt Goldstein and Adhémar Gelb, the latter of whom later supervised her PhD thesis. She was also taught by Edmund Husserl, Paul Tillich and Martin Buber and would later repeatedly state in interviews that Husserl's school of phenomenology had significantly influenced her work as a psychotherapist.

In 1929 she married Friedrich (Fritz) Perls whom she had met during one of Goldstein and Gelb's lectures. Fritz had met Wilhelm Reich during a short visit in Vienna and began working with him as a patient soon after. Lore cited his influence on both her and Fritz's work, and credited Reich with significantly influencing their development of the Gestalt approach. Their daughter Renate was born in 1931, and their son (who later also became a psychotherapist) was born in 1935.

Living in Berlin in the early 1930s, Lore and her husband became politically involved and felt connected to anti-fascist and communist organising, however they never joined the communist party. Upon the Nazis' rise to power in 1933, the Perls fled Germany for the Netherlands and in 1934 moved on to South Africa, where they stayed for 13 years. During their first months in South Africa, Lore's mother visited the young family and stayed for eight to nine months but returned to Hamburg soon after. Unable to secure visas for them to South Africa, Lore's mother, sister and niece would eventually all fall victim to the Holocaust. Lore's father had already succumbed to a heart attack in March 1933.

While living in Johannesburg, the Perls established a psychoanalytical institute and wrote their first book Ego, Hunger and Aggression: A Revision of Freud's Theory and Method, published in 1942. While the book credits Fritz as the sole author, several chapters were written (almost) exclusively by Lore. This held true for several further publications. While developing their novel therapeutic approach, the couple debated possible names, eventually opting for "Gestalt Therapy".

The couple moved to New York in 1946/47. Lore had followed 18 months after Fritz's arrival together with their children. When her husband moved to the west coast, Lore continued running the New York Institute for Gestalt Therapy which they had co-founded together and soon counted Paul Goodman amongst her first clients. Having already read Goodman's work while living in South Africa and having been particularly interested in his article Politics and Partisan Reviews, the couple soon began working with him and Ralph Hefferline and co-published Gestalt Therapy: Excitement and Growth in the Human Personality, although Laura remained unacknowledged as a contributor. By 1952, with the help of Paul Goodman, they had established The New York Institute for Gestalt Therapy (Fadiman & Frager, 2002).

Following relational difficulties between the couple, Fritz moved to Big Sur in California for a residency at the Esalen Institute. These difficulties coincided with Lore's increasingly equal professional success as a psychotherapist, and caused tension in the relationship. Lore stayed on in New York and continued to run the original institute for nearly 30 more years, long after Fritz's death. Throughout his life but particularly upon his move to California, Fritz had failed to be there for his children and grandchildren, which caused long-term emotional pain to his family.

Eventually, Lore took on the more American first name Laura.

From 1969 onwards, Laura began visiting Europe every summer, holding workshops in England, the Netherlands, Belgium and later also Germany. During this time she further developed her approach to supervision by shifting the focus from the supervisee's client to the supervisee's inner world. Her husband died in 1970.

Having moved back to her native Pforzheim to be closer to her daughter, Laura Perls died in Pforzheim in 1990 following complications with her thyroid. Having smuggled Fritz' ashes with her from New York, she was buried together with him in the Posner family grave in the Jewish cemetery in Pforzheim.

The English edition of her only solo book, Living at the Boundary, was published posthumously in 1992.
