= Fritz Perls =

German-born psychiatrist (1893–1970)

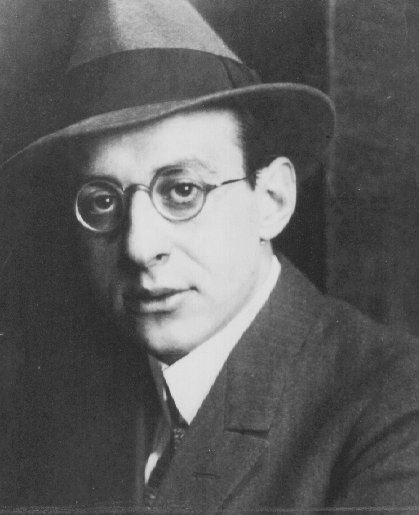
- Perls in 1923
- Born: July 8, 1893; Berlin, German Empire
- Died: March 14, 1970 (aged 76); Chicago, Illinois, US
- Known for: Coining term: Gestalt Therapy
- Spouse: Laura Perls
- Scientific career
- Fields: Psychiatry, psychotherapy

Friedrich Salomon Perls (July 8, 1893 – March 14, 1970), better known as Fritz Perls, was a German-born psychiatrist, psychoanalyst and psychotherapist. Perls coined the term "Gestalt therapy" to identify the form of psychotherapy that he developed with his wife, Laura Perls, in the 1940s and 1950s. In 1964, Perls became associated with the Esalen Institute (U.S.) where he lived until 1969.

The core of the Gestalt therapy process is enhanced awareness of sensation, perception, bodily feelings, emotion, and behavior, in the present moment. Relationship is emphasized, along with contact between the self, its environment, and the other.

== Life ==
Fritz Perls was born in Berlin, Germany, in 1893. He grew up in the bohemian scene in Berlin, participated in Expressionism and Dadaism, and experienced the turning of the artistic avant-garde toward the revolutionary left. Deployment to the front line, the trauma of war, antisemitism, intimidation, escape, and the Holocaust are further key sources of biographical influence.

He was expected to practice law, following his distinguished uncle Herman Staub, but instead he studied medicine. Perls joined the German Army during World War I and spent time in the trenches. After the war in 1918 he returned to his medical studies graduating two years later, specializing in neuropsychiatry as a medical doctor, and then became an assistant to Kurt Goldstein, who worked with brain injured soldiers. Perls gravitated toward psychoanalysis.

In 1927, Perls became a member of Wilhelm Reich's technical seminars in Vienna. Reich's concept of character analysis influenced Perls to a large extent. And in 1930 Reich became Perls' supervising senior analyst in Berlin.

In 1930, Perls married Laura Perls (born Lore Posner) and they had two children together, Renate and Stephen. In 1933, soon after the Hitler regime came to power, being of Jewish descent and because of their anti-fascist political activities in the time before, Perls, Laura, and their eldest child Renate fled to the Netherlands, and one year later they emigrated to South Africa, where Perls started a psychoanalytic training institute. In 1936 he had a brief and unsatisfactory meeting with Freud.

In 1942, Perls joined the South African army, and he served as an army psychiatrist with the rank of captain until 1946. While in South Africa, Perls was influenced by the "holism" of Jan Smuts. During this period Fritz Perls co-wrote his first book, Ego, Hunger, and Aggression (published in 1942 and re-published in 1947). Laura Perls wrote two chapters of the book, although when it was re-published in the United States she was not given any recognition for her work.

Fritz and Laura Perls left South Africa in 1946 and ended up in New York City, where Fritz Perls worked briefly with Karen Horney, and Wilhelm Reich. After living through a peripatetic episode, during which he lived in Montreal and served as a cruise ship psychiatrist, Perls finally settled in Manhattan. Perls wrote his second book with the assistance of New York intellectual and author, Paul Goodman, who drafted the theoretical second part of the book based upon Perls' hand-written notes. Perls and Goodman were influenced by the work of Kurt Lewin and Otto Rank. Along with the experiential first part, written with Ralph Hefferline, the book was entitled Gestalt Therapy and published in 1951.

Thereafter, Fritz and Laura Perls started the first Gestalt Institute in their Manhattan apartment. Fritz Perls began traveling throughout the United States in order to conduct Gestalt workshops and training.

In 1960 Fritz Perls left Laura Perls behind in Manhattan and moved to Los Angeles, where he practiced in conjunction with Jim Simkin. He started to offer workshops at Esalen Institute in Big Sur, California, in 1963. Perls became interested in Zen during this period, and incorporated the idea of mini-satori (a brief awakening) into his practice. He also traveled to Japan, where he stayed in a Zen monastery.

Eventually, he settled at Esalen, and even built a house on the grounds. One of his students at Esalen was Dick Price, who developed Gestalt Practice, based in large part upon what he learned from Perls. At Esalen, Perls collaborated with Ida Rolf, founder of Rolfing, to address the relationship between the mind and the body.

Perls has been widely cited outside the realm of psychotherapy for a quotation often described as the "Gestalt prayer":

I do my thing and you do your thing.

I am not in this world to live up to your expectations,
and you are not in this world to live up to mine.
You are you, and I am I,
and if by chance we find each other, it's beautiful.
If not, it can't be helped.

— Fritz Perls, Gestalt Therapy Verbatim, 1969

In 1969 Perls left Esalen and started a Gestalt community at Lake Cowichan on Vancouver Island, Canada. There, he hosted eight educational films on his gestalt therapy, which were directed by Stanley Fox for Aquarian Productions, a film production company started by Perls associate Norman Hirt.

Fritz Perls died of heart failure in Chicago, on March 14, 1970, after heart surgery at the Louis A. Weiss Memorial Hospital.

== Lifestyle ==
Perls was a heavy smoker, first experiencing cigarettes at the age of eight but then becoming a chain smoker due to his experiences in the Second World War, Perls also used LSD recreationally during the 1960s.

Perls practiced non-monogamy and had many sexual and romantic encounters outside of his marriage to Laura Perls. He describes his marriage to Laura as partners with shared goals that had episodes of love.

== Reception ==
Perls' approach to therapy was included in criticism by Jeffrey Masson, a psychoanalyst who feuded with journalists and with the psychoanalytic community generally over his controversial theories disputing the effectiveness of psychotherapy. Masson said that Perls was sexist, as well as physically and emotionally abusive towards women in his private life. Masson quoted Perls from his autobiography, In and Out the Garbage Pail, where Perls wrote:

Once I was called to a group to calm down a girl who attacked everyone in the group physically. The group members tried to hold her and to calm her down. In vain. Again and again she got up and fought. When I came in she charged with her head down into my belly and nearly knocked me over: Then I let her have it until I had her on the floor. Up she came again. And then a third time. I got her down again and said, gasping: "I've beaten up more than one bitch in my life." Then she got up, threw her arms around me: "Fritz, I love you." Apparently she finally got what, all her life, she was asking for.

And there are thousands of women like her in the States. Provoking and tantalizing, bitching, irritating their husbands and never getting their spanking. You don't have to be a Parisian prostitute to need that so as to respect your man. A Polish saying is: "My husband lost interest in me, he never beats me any more."

Therapist Barry Stevens, who met Fritz Perls for the first time in 1967, described a different impression of him. She wrote: "... I know that Fritz doesn't like his arrogance, and along with it, he has such a beautiful humility." And later she said: "Fritz is almost always a very warm and gentle old gentleman now."

Stevens also described another incident from a group therapy session: "... Fritz Perls asked us all a question and waited for answers. ... I said nothing. He said 'Barry?' 'I'm blank," I said. He nodded and went on to someone or something else. How nice to have my blankness easily accepted."

Mary Henle criticized Perls and the theory of Gestalt psychotherapy. She showed that Gestalt psychotherapy had little in common with Gestalt psychology except at a superficial level.

Erving Polster, psychologist and Gestalt therapist, founding faculty member of the Gestalt Institute of Cleveland in 1953, said about Fritz Perls: “From Fritz I got the realization that a person could have incredible range in characteristics. I could experience Fritz as the most cutting and as the most tender of all people.”

== Selected publications ==
- Perls, F., Ego, Hunger and Aggression (1942, 1947) ISBN 0-939266-18-0
- Perls, F., Hefferline, R., & Goodman, P., Gestalt Therapy: Excitement and Growth in the Human Personality (1951) ISBN 0-939266-24-5
- Perls, F., Gestalt Therapy Verbatim (1969) ISBN 0-911226-02-8.
- Perls, F., In and Out the Garbage Pail (1969) ISBN 0-553-20253-7
- Perls, F., The Gestalt Approach and Eye Witness to Therapy (1973) ISBN 0-8314-0034-X
