= List of Socialist Party of Great Britain members =

List of members of a British political party

This is a list of notable current and former members of the Socialist Party of Great Britain. Where available, their term of membership is indicated.

- E. J. B. Allen (1904–1906)
- Moses Baritz
- Robert Barltrop
- Dan Billany (1931–1933)
- John Bird (1950s)
- Adam Buick (1962–)
- Jim D'Arcy (1943-1991)
- Jack Fitzgerald (1904–1929)
- R. M. Fox
- Edgar Hardcastle (1922–1991)
- George Hicks (1904, 1908–1910)
- Thomas A. Jackson (1904–1909)
- Albert E. Jacomb (1904–1942)
- Jack Kent (1904–1908)
- Con Lehane (1904–1906)
- Joan Lestor
- Cyril May (1940-1991)
- Valentine McEntee (1904–1905)
- Hans Neumann (1904–1911)
- John Rowan
- David Ramsay Steele (1960s)
- George Walford
- Laurie Weidberg
- Harry Young (1940–1991)
