= Socialist Party of Great Britain debates =

Debates between the Socialist Party of Great Britain and other groups were a core component of promoting the SPGB's doctrines and exposing its message to a broader audience.

Debates were not a major part of the SPGB until the 1930s. Before then, the party instead relied on outdoor speaking, particularly at established street corner venues. The number of SPGB debates held peaked in the 1980s. In the last ten years, however, debating has virtually ceased as an operation of the SPGB.

The SPGB has been noted for its willingness to debate against far right figures such as S. R. Probyn, Michael Goulding and Raven Thompson from the British Union of Fascists, and Denis Pirie from the National Front.

Until the 1970s, debates were primarily held in the winter months. Most of the debates have occurred in London, where the party headquarters is based.

== List of debates ==
This is not a full list since many debates, particularly in the early years, went unreported in the Socialist Standard, the main source of information.

Date	Opponent	Affiliation/stance	SPGB speaker	Venue	Notes
1905-10-29	W. A. Wilson	Cobden Club	Jack Fitzgerald	Dovecote Hall, 78 High Road, Wood Green	
1906-08-12	G. Geis	Socialist Labour Party	Jack Fitzgerald	Peckham Rye (outdoor)	
1906-10-07	J. Davis	Liberal Party	Alex Anderson	Finsbury Park (outdoor)	
1907-01-20	E. J. B. Allen	Socialist Labour Party	Jack Fitzgerald	Engineers Institute, Plumstead	
1907-09-20	Mr. Whybrow	Independent Labour Party	Alex Anderson	Tottenham (outdoor)	
1907-11-20	Tom Swann	Independent Labour Party	J. W. Marsh	Co-operative Hall, Ashton Old Road, Manchester	
1908-01-12	W. Underwood	Anarchist	Jack Fitzgerald	Laburnum House, 134 High Street, Battersea	
1908-01-12	R. C. K. Ensor	Independent Labour Party	Alex Anderson	Poplar, East London	
1908-02-23	N. Walter	Anarchist	Jack Fitzgerald	Laburnum House, 134 High Street, Battersea	
1908-05-03	Lawler Wilson	Anti-Socialist Union	Jack Fitzgerald	Battersea Town Hall, Lavender Hill, SW	
1908-06-18	Mr. Theedham	Central Finsbury Liberal Association	Jack Fitzgerald	Islington (outdoor)	
1908-08-02	W. Davis	Socialist Labour Party	Jack Fitzgerald	Bury	
1909-03-12	Mr. Urwin	Anti-Socialist Union	Alex Anderson	Tottenham, North London	
1909-05-27	E. J. B. Allen	Industrialist League	Jack Fitzgerald	Latchmere Road Baths, Battersea, SW	
1909-10-13	T. A. Jackson	Independent Labour Party	Jack Fitzgerald	Tooting Graveney schools, Tooting, SW	
1910-04-01	Percy Alden, MP	Liberal Party	Alex Anderson	Earlesmead School, Tottenham	
1910-04-04	Mr. Wimbourne	Liberal Party	F. E. Dawkins	Manor Park, East London	
1910-06	G. W. de Tunzelmann	Anti-Socialist Union	Jack Fitzgerald	Rusholme Public Hall, Rusholme, Manchester	
1911-06-01	Albion Richardson, MP	Liberal Party	Jack Fitzgerald	Liberal Club, Peckham	
1911-06-03	Laura Ainsworth	Women's Social and Political Union	Alex Anderson	Clock Tower, Gravesend	
1912-02-28	Rev. G. S. Poole	Vicar of St. James's, Gravesend	F. Vickers	St. James' Church Institute., Gravesend	
1912-03-26	A. E. Moise	North London Christian Evidence League	F. Vickers	Caledonian Road Baths, Islington	
1912-05-21	Samuel Samuels	Conservative Party	Jack Fitzgerald	Graveney Road Schools, Tooting	
1913-07-25	J. Ingham	Independent Labour Party	Jack Fitzgerald	Assembly Rooms, Brighton	
1913-10	Mr. Hawker	Independent Labour Party	T. Wilkins	Wealdstone	
1925-03-08	F. Kirkley	London Constitutional Labour Movement	R. Reynolds	Leyton Town Hall, High Road, Leyton	
1927-10-09	G. R. Wheeler	Conservative Party	Jack Fitzgerald	Battersea Town Hall	
1927-11-13	Major H. Gillespie	Economic League	E. Hardy	Stratford Town Hall, Stratford Broadway	
1928-01-25	Edward Baker	Young Liberal League	Adolph Kohn	Earlham Hall, Forest Gate	
1928-04-20	Philip Guedalla	Liberal Party	Jack Fitzgerald	Co-op Hall, Platt Lane, Rusholme, Manchester	
1928-05-23	James Maxton	Independent Labour Party	Jack Fitzgerald	Memorial Hall, Farringdon Street, EC1	
1929-04-07	A. Marshall Diston	Independent Labour Party	E. Hardy	Stratford Town Hall	
1930-03-28	J. T. Murphy	Communist Party of Great Britain	Eric Boden	AEU Institute, Stanley Road, Sheffield	
1931-05-27	Peter Kerrigan	Communist Party of Great Britain	Alex Shaw	Chalmers Street, Clydebank, Glasgow	
1931-06-14	Stuart Barr	New Party	E. Hardy	Stratford Town Hall	
1932-01-14	H. Crooks	Independent Labour Party	Edmund Howarth	NUT, 3 Highams Place, Newcastle	
1932-11-15	Atkins	National Guild of Co-operators	Isaac Ginsberg	Co-operative Hall, Sutton	
1932-11-27	Mrs E. Tennant	Conservative Party	E. Hardy	Stratford Town Hall	
1932-12-02	N. Dunbar	Independent Labour Party	E. Hardy	Bethnal Green Town Hall	
1933-02-13	Mrs E. Tennant	Conservative Party	E. Hardy	Public Hall, Canning Town	
1933-02-19	Michael Stewart	Labour Party	G. Bellingham	Poplar Town Hall	
1933-05-07	Ralph Fox	Communist Party of Great Britain	Sid Rubin	Grove House, High Road, Leyton	
1934-10-19	G. H. Loman	Labour Party	Robertus	Working Men's Club, Clerkenwell Road	
1935-03-23	Probyn	British Union of Fascists	E. Hardy	Mawney Road Schools, Romford	
1936-01-12	M. Goulding	British Union of Fascists	Robertus	Craigwell Café, Peter Street, Manchester	
1936-11-06	Guy Aldred	anarchist	J. Higgins	Clarion Scouts Hall, North Portland Street, Glasgow	
1936-12-07	Raj Hansa	Bolshevik-Leninists	Adolph Kohn	AEU Hall, 39 Doughty Street, WC1	
1937-02-01	Capt. Munford	Peace Pledge Union	G. Clifford	AEU Hall, 39 Doughty Street, WC1	
1937-03-14	David Keir	News Chronicle	F. Grainger	AEU Hall, 39 Doughty Street, WC1	
1937-04-07	Jack Gaster	Communist Party of Great Britain	Sammy Cash	Chiswick Town Hall, Heathfield Terrace, W4	
1937-04-12	Claud Jacob	Constructive Commonwealth Union	F. Grainger	AEU Hall, 39 Doughty Street, WC1	
1937-06-07	Dr. E. Conze	Labour Party	E. Hardy	Essex Hall, Essex Street, Strand	
1937-06-17	R. Gilion	pro-united front	Bill Waters	Petit Farm, Heathway, Dagenham	
1937-06-25	Raj Hansa	Bolshevik-Leninists	Eric Boden	Friars Hall, Blackfriars Road, SE1	
1938-01-28	C.L.R. James	Marxist Group	G. Clifford	Trade Union Hall, 24 New Oxford Street	
1938-02-20	Fenner Brockway & Bob Edwards	Independent Labour Party	[?]	Co-op Hall, Downing Street, Manchester	
1938-10-14	M. A. Phillips	Social Credit Party	E. Hardy	Mawney Road School, Romford	
1940-05-06	Barbara Wootton	Federal Union	E. Hardy	Conway Hall	
1940-05-19	Gerry Bradley	Fourth International	Sid Rubin	Conway Hall	
1941-11-16	Eva Hubback	pro-family allowances	Clifford Groves	Conway Hall	
1942-01-11	Frank Ridley	Independent Labour Party	Clifford Groves	Conway Hall	
1942-02-22	Raj Hansa	Trotskyist[?]	Tony Turner	Conway Hall	
1942-07-22	Walter Padley	Independent Labour Party	Clifford Groves	Friends Hall, Greenleaf Road, Walthamstow	
1942-12-20	D. McGregor	Independent Labour Party	Sammy Cash	St. Ann's Library, Tottenham	
1942-12-20	M. G. Bennett	Labour Party	A. Reginald	Labour Rooms, 95 Grove Vale, SE22	
1943-01-24	Mat Kavanagh	Anarchist Federation	Tony Turner	Islington Central Library, Holloway Road, N7	
1943-05-03	Capt. B. Acworth	Liberty Restoration League	Sid Rubin	Conway Hall	
1943-12-01	Walter Padley	Independent Labour Party	Sammy Cash	Central Hall, Acton	
1944-01-23	Jock Haston	Workers International League	Tony Turner	Conway Hall	
1945-01-14	A. Cooper	Revolutionary Communist Party	Desmond Fenwick	Ruskin House, Wellesley Road, Croydon	
1944-03-18	C. Allaun	Labour Party	Harry Young	Chorlton Town Hall, All Saints, Manchester	
1944-04-08	Sir Waldron Smithers	Conservative Party	Clifford Groves	Shoreditch Town Hall	
1943-09-23	E. Grant	Revolutionary Communist Party	Tony Turner	Holborn Hall	
1942-11-14	Commander E. Prior	Conservative Party	Harry Young	Romford Road Baths, Stratford	
1946-05-10	Frank Maitland	Independent Labour Party	Harry Young	Shacklewell Lane schools, Hackney	
1946-12-16	Major Guy Lloyd, MP	Conservative Party	Tony Turner	St. Andrews Grand Hall, Glasgow	
1947-02-12	Tom Howard	Conservative Party	Tony Turner	Islington Town Hall, Upper Street, N1	
1947-07-14	Evan Durbin	Labour Party	Tony Turner	Edmonton Town Hall	
1946-07-16	Jock Haston	Revolutionary Communist Party	Desmond Fenwick	Bethnal Green Central Library	
1946-10-17	Tom Colyer	Independent Labour Party	Cyril May	Co-op Hall, Lakedale Road, Plumstead, SE18	
1946-11-10	Alexander Raven Thomson	Union of British Freedom	Tony Turner	Kensington Town Hall	
1909-11-19	Jock Haston	Revolutionary Communist Party	Clifford Groves	Co-op Hall, Hampton Wick	
1905-12-22	R. Tearse	Revolutionary Communist Party	Harry Young	Bethnal Green Central Library	
1948-02-05	George Hansen	Revolutionary Communist Party	Harry Young	Ealing Town Hall	
1948-02-19	Sir Waldron Smithers, MP	League of Individualists	Cyril May	Surbiton Assembly Rooms	
1948-04-12	Colin Brooks	Society of Individualists	Clifford Groves	Kensington Town Hall	
1948-06-01	George Jones	Communist Party of Great Britain	Tony Turner	Hornsey Town Hall	
1948-06-07	John Parker	Labour Party	Clifford Groves	Fulham Town Hall	
1948-07-01	R. Tearse	Revolutionary Communist Party	Desmond Fenwick	Conway Hall	
1948-07	Christopher Hollis, MP	Conservative Party	Harry Young	Ealing Town Hall	
1905-08-12	J. M. Hutchinson	Industrial Workers of the World	Bill Waters	Watling Community Centre, Orange Hill Road, Burnt Oak	
1948-11-28	D. Garbutt	Revolutionary Communist Party	Tony Mulheron	Glasgow Central Halls	
1949-01-20	G. Hansen	Revolutionary Communist Party	Cyril May	Greenford Library, Oldfield Lane, Greenford	
1949-02-28	Frederick Mullally	Labour Party	Tony Turner	Fulham Town Hall	
1949-03-21	Arthur Blenkinsop, MP	Labour Party	Harry Young	Kensington Town Hall	
1949-04-04	David Eccles, MP	Conservative Party	Bill Waters	Ealing Town Hall	
1949-05-05	S. W. Alexander	Society of Individual Freedom	Tony Turner	Ealing Town Hall	
1949-05-19	Bernard Braine	Conservative Party	Jim D'Arcy	British Legion Hall, Rayleigh, Essex	
1949-06-29	R. Graham Page	Conservative Party	Harry Young	Islington Town Hall	
1949-07-08	J. Frankenburg	Liberal Party	W. Reed	Bethnal Green Library, Cambridge Heath Road, E2	
1949-07-22	F. Martel	Liberal Party	Harry Young	Stag House Civic Restaurant, The Broadway, Burnt Oak	
1905-11-15	J. Sack	Young Communist League	Douglas Verity	Tottenham Central Library	
1905-12-15	J. Paul	Conservative Party	Tony Turner	Assembly Hall, Forest Road, Walthamstow, E17	
1950-02-06	Mrs B. Curtis	Liberal Party	Harry Young	Manor Street baths, Clapham	
1950-03-09	Raven Thompson	Fascist	Douglas Verity	Co-op Hall, 129 Seven Sisters Road, N7	
1950-04-03	G. Kraus	Crusade for World Government	Tony Turner	Barnfield Road School, Burnt Oak	
1950-04-18	[?]	Independent Labour Party	[?]	Fulham Central Library	
1950-07-19	Sir Waldron Smithers, MP	Conservative Party	Harry Young	Poplar Civic Theatre, Bow Road, E3	
1950-10-06	Roy Douglas	Liberal Party	Frederick James	Bethnal Green Library	
1950-10-29	Rev. K. Parkinson	Christian	Arthur George	The Ring, Handside Lane, Welwyn Garden City	
1950-11-03	V. H. Blundell	Henry George School of Social Science	W. Read	Bethnal Green Library, Cambridge Heath Road, E2	
1950-11-05	Karl Westwood	Labour Party	Bill Waters	Vernon Hall, Sheen	
1950-11-16	E. Atkins	Peace Pledge Union	G. Waters	Civic Hall, Crown Hill, Croydon	
1950-12-13	G. F. Plume	Peace Pledge Union	London speaker	Co-op Hall, 129 Seven Sisters Road, N7	
1951-02-02	Sybil Morrison	Peace Pledge Union	Frederick James	Bethnal Green Library	
1951-03-30	Sybil Morrison	Peace Pledge Union	Frederick James	Bethnal Green Library	
1951-11-25	Eddie Shaw	London Anarchist Group	Tony Turner	Denison House, Vauxhall Bridge Road, SW1	
1951-12-17	Ashley Bramall	Labour Party	James Thorburn	Scouts Hall, Mayplace Road, Bexley Heath	
1952-01-14	Roy Douglas	Liberal Party	James Thorburn	Shoreditch Town Hall	
1952-06-19	Arnold Bender	Liberal Party	Tony Turner	Greenford Library, Oldfield Lane, Greenford, Middx	
1952-10-02	George Plume	Peace Pledge Union	Harry Young	Hammersmith Town Hall	
1952-11-24	George Schwartz	The Sunday Times	E. Hardy	Kensington Town Hall	
1953-02-09	Roy Douglas	Liberal Party	Jim D'Arcy	Hammersmith Town Hall	
1953-03-01	Philip Sansom	London Anarchist Group	Tony Turner	Dennison House	
1953-03-16	Gordon Evans	United Nations Association	Tony Turner	Kensington Town Hall	
1953-06-04	H. Polland	Liberal Party	W. Kerr	Salisbury Road School, Manor Park, E12	
1951-09-08	Roy Douglas	Liberal Party	Tony Turner	Red Cross Hall, 153 Shirley Road, Addiscombe	
1951-11-11	A. G. Jenkins	Sunday Chronicle	Tony Turner	Fulham Town Hall	
1951-12-10	Winifred Watson	Crusade for World Government	H. Reed	Ealing Town Hall	
1951-12-16	Ayana Deva Angadi	author	Cyril May	Fulham Town Hall	
1954-01-22	Arthur Skeffington, MP	Labour Party	Cyril May	Mellow Lane School, Hayes, Middx.	
1954-02-07	John Fitzgerald	Crusade for World Government	Harry Young	Ilford Town Hall	
1954-02-19	G. Plume	Peace Pledge Union	W. Read	Bethnal Green Library	
1954-10-29	Jean Henderson	Liberal Party	Robert Coster	Trade Union Hall, Woodford Road, Watford	
1954-11-17	P. Monkhouse	Peace Pledge Union	W. Kerr	Ilford Labour Hall, High Road, Ilford	
1954-12-19	R. B. Wilkie	Scottish National Congress	Alex Shaw	Central Halls, Bath Street, Glasgow	
1955-01-16	Oliver Brown	Scottish National Congress	Tony Mulheron	Central Halls, Glasgow	
1955-04-24	W. Watson	Jehovah's witness	Horace Jarvis	SPGB Head Office, Clapham, SW4	
1955-05-02	Colin Brown	Liberal Party	J. Higgins	St. Andrews Halls, Glasgow	
1955-11-16	Evan Richards	Liberal Party	Bob Coster	Leyton Town Hall, High Road, E10	
1956-02-06	Frank Maitland	Independent Labour Party	E. Wilmott	Central Library, Spa Road, Bermondsey	
1956-11-19	Frank Maitland	Independent Labour Party	Bob Coster	Fulham Town Hall	
1956-12-14	J. Britz	Militant Socialist Group	W. Read	Bethnal Green Library	
1957-01-25	Rev. J. Penny-Davies	Christian	J. Flowers	Broadmead Baptist Chapel, Bristol	
1957-03-20	B. Henderson	Communist Party of Great Britain	Harry Baldwin	Guildhall Chambers, Bristol	
1957-03-31	Barr	Catholic Evidence Society	H Jarvis	SPGB Head Office, Clapham, SW4	
1956-05-16	Donald Rooum	London Anarchist Group	Bob Coster	Bethnal Green Library	
1955-11-04	E. J. Ham	Union Movement	Jim D'Arcy	Lambeth Town Hall	
1955-12-11	Terence Chivers	Peace Pledge Union	D. M. de la Touche	Laurie Arms, Crawford Place, N1	
1954-12-15	Alan Tomkins	Socialist Labour Party	Cyril May	Dennison House, Vauxhall Bridge Road, SW1	
1958-01-17	John Fitzgerald	Proportional Representation Society	E. Glucksberg	Bethnal Green Town Hall	
1958-01-31	Roy Douglas	Liberal Party	E. Critchfield	Bethnal Green Town Hall, Cambridge Heath Road, E2	
1958-03-30	V. R. Hill	Social Credit Propaganda League	Bob Coster	St. Andrew's Halls, Kent Road, Glasgow	
1958-12-08	S. Thomas	Liberal Party	Frederick James	People's Hall, Heathcoate Street, Nottingham	
1959-02-20	B. K. Preuss	Labour Party	M. Harris	Co-op Hall, Prewett Street, Bristol	
1959-05-10	Father Bernard Rickett	Catholic Church	Bob Coster	Coop Educational Centre, Broad Street, Nottingham	
1959-06-15	Rev. P. M. Barker	Liberal Party	J. Higgins	Community Centre, Bellshill, Lanarkshire	
1961-06-14	Gordon Browne	Liberal Party	James D'Arcy	Public Hall, High Street, Carshalton	
1961-10-29	Richard Headicar	Campaign for Nuclear Disarmament	Melvin Harris	Denison House, 296 Vauxhall Bridge Road, SW1	
1962-05-14	Edward Martell	National Fellowship	Jim D'Arcy	Conway Hall	
1962-11-15	Councillor Evans	Liberal Party	Labour Hall, Boston Avenue, Southend		
1961-11-19	J. Mathieson	Campaign for Nuclear Disarmament	Harry Baldwin	St Albans Hall, Walworth Road, SE17	
1963-03-29	J. Mumby	Liberal Party	Cyril May	Bromley Library, High Street, Bromley	
1963-04-22	Henry Tomkin	Conservative Party	Laurie Weidberg	Conway Hall	
1964-02-23	J. Palmer	Labour Party	Jim D'Arcy	Mahatma Gandhi Hall, Fitzroy Square, W1	
1964-03-18	Sydney Bidwell	Labour Party	Cyril May	Hammersmith Town Hall	
1963-05-08	J. Haigh	INDEC	Edmund Grant	Bromley Library, High Street, Bromley	
1959-06-18	Jim Plant	Socialist Labour Party	Harry Baldwin	Conway Hall	
1958-06-25	Alan Lomas	New Liberal Party (UK)	Robert Ambridge	Co-op Hall, 129 Seven Sisters Road, N7	
1967-05-21	Tony Southall	Vietnam Solidarity Campaign	Dick Donnelly	McLellan Galleries, Sauchiehall Street, Glasgow	
1967-09-13	Mr. Powell	Labour Party Young Socialists	Bob Ambridge	Swansea	
1967-12-10	Dafydd Stephens	Plaid Cymru	Adam Buick	2 Soho Square, W1	
1967-12-11	R. Kerr	Shelter	Ray Guy	Ealing Town Hall	
1968-01[?]	Tom Kemp	Socialist Labour League	Adam Buick	Hull University	
1968-07-16	D. Davies	Young Liberals	Adam Buick	Swansea	
1969-05	Joe Bent	Communist Party of Great Britain	Ralph Critchfield	Havil Street Hall, Peckham Road, SE5	
1969-11-17	D. Pirie	British National Front	Edmund Grant	Hornsey Town Hall	
1970-05	Jeffries & Lavery	International Socialists	Jim Fleming & Vic Vanni	Free Gardener's Hall, Edinburgh	
1970-09-14	Cllr. Vic Butler	Labour Party	Adam Buick	Muswell Hill library	
1972-04-08	[?]	Independent Labour Party	Jim D'Arcy	Bolton Institute of Technology, Deane Road, Bolton	
1973-05-09	[?]	Young Conservatives	Robert Barltrop	Muswell Hill library, N10	
1973-09-23	Dr. E. Wilson	Family Planning Association	Dick Donnelly	McLellan Galleries	
1974-06-06	Sydney Bidwell	Labour Party	Robert Barltrop	Ealing Town Hall	
1975-04-24	Sir Keith Joseph	Conservative Party	E. Hardy	Phillippa Fawcett College	
1974-06-06	Sydney Bidwell, MP	Labour Party	Bob Coster	Ealing Town Hall	
1969-07-03	Paul Gerhardt	International Socialists	Jim D'Arcy	Clarendon Press Institute, Walton Street, Oxford	
1967-09-21	[?]	Scottish Republican Clubs	Vic Vanni	McLellan Galleries	
1967-12-02	M. Brook	Labour Party Young Socialists	Tony D'Arcy	Greenford Co-op Hall, Greenford Lane	
1977-08-20	[?]	International Communist Current	E. Hardy	SPGB Head Office, Clapham, SW4	
1978-02-02	[?]	Young Conservatives	Jim D'Arcy	Royal Oak, York Street, W1	
1977-05-13	[?]	International Communist Current	[?]	Leeds Trade Club, Saville Mount, Leeds	
1977-07-14	[?]	Ecology Party	[?]	Friends Meeting House, Ward Street, Guildford	
1977-10-01	[?]	Workers Party of Scotland	[?]	McLellan Galleries	
1979-01-25	[?]	Scottish Labour College	Vic Vanni	Trades Council Halls, 14 Picardy Place, Edinburgh	
1979-01-28	[?]	Workers Party of Scotland	Campbell McEwan	McLellan Galleries	
1979-03-06	Horace Cutler	Conservative Party	[?]	University College London	
1979-09-09	David Ramsay Steele	Libertarian Alliance	E. Hardy	SPGB Head Office, Clapham, SW4	
1977-11-02	David Alton, MP	Liberal Party	Adam Buick	Liverpool University Students Union	
1980-05-03	[?]	International Communist Current	Barry McNeeney	Dr Johnson House, Bull Street, Birmingham	
1980-06-13	David Ramsay Steele	Libertarian Alliance	Brown	Friends Meeting House, North Street, Guildford	
1980-07-30	secretary	Stoke Communist Party	Steve Coleman	Resource Centre, Mollart Street, Hanley	
1980-11-07	David Milburn	Conservative Party	Harry Young	Carlton Arms, Seaham	
1981-05-08	Arthur Seldon	Institute of Economic Affairs	E. Hardy	Guildford Friends Meeting House	
1981-05-14	P. Braithwaite	Campaign for Nuclear Disarmament	Steve Coleman	Dr Johnson House, Birmingham	
1981-05-15	N. Smith	Social Democratic Party	Barry McNeeney	Carlton Arms, Seaham, County Durham	
1981-09-10	David Ramsay Steele	Libertarian Alliance	Ron Cook	Prince Albert Pub, Wharfdale Road, London, N1	
1980-09-11	Prof. Antony Flew	anti-socialist	Steve Coleman	Bellerby Theatre, Leadale Lane, Guildford	
1958-10-09	A. Yeeles	Campaign for Nuclear Disarmament	Pieter Lawrence	Finsbury Library, St John Street, EC1	
1958-11-19	[?]	Scottish National Party	Howard Moss	Prince Albert	
1954-12-09	B. Ritchie	Association of World Federalists	Barry Sinclair	Princess Royal, 47 Hereford Road, W2	
1982-01-14	Edward Charles	Christian Socialist Movement	Barry McNeeney	Prince Albert	
1982-02-11	Albert Meltzer	Black Flag	Dick Donnelly	Prince Albert	
1982-02-24	William Shepherd	Militant tendency	Steve Coleman	Ruskin House, Combe Road, Croydon	
1982-03-07	[?]	Labour Party Young Socialists	Barry McNeeney	Labour Rooms, Blackburn Road, Accrington	
1982-05-13	B. Kissen	Poale Zion	Eddy Grant	Prince Albert	
1982-08-12	Tadek Jarski	Solidarity with Solidarity	Vic Vanni	Prince Albert	
1982-08-27	Keith Chesterton	Labour Party	Eddy Grant	Guildford	
1982-09-08	[?]	Croydon Campaign for Nuclear Disarmament	Pieter Lawrence	Ruskin House, Croydon	
1982-11-11	Monty Johnstone	Communist Party of Great Britain	Steve Coleman	Islington Central Library	
1951-12-02	Richard Blaustein	Conservative Party	[?]	Prince Albert	
1983-01-20	David Martin	Social Democratic Party	Steve Coleman	Prince Albert	
1983-02-03	R. Hughes	Conservative Party	Pat Deutz	Libraries Hall, Spa Road, Bermondsey, SE1	
1983-02-11	Margaret Sharp	Social Democratic Party	E. Hardy	Mount Social Club, Portsmouth Road, Guildford	
1983-02-17	J. Lewis	Coalition for Peace through Security	Steve Coleman	Prince Albert	
1983-03-02	I. Smedley	Labour Party	[?]	Ruskin House, Croydon	
1983-04-14	Susan Ardril	Spare Rib	Christine Moss	Prince Albert	
1983-05-01	Paul Hirst	controlled market economy	E. Hardy	Prince Albert	
1983-07-07	Tony Jones	Ecology Party	Pieter Lawrence	Prince Albert	
1983-09-09	Ted Haywood	Ecology Party	Pieter Lawrence	Mount Social Club, Guildford	
1983-09-21	J. Lewis	Coalition for Peace through Security	Ralph Critchfield	Christ Church Hall, Waterden Road, Guildford	
1951-10-07	Arthur Johnston	Conservative Party	E. Hardy	The Prince Albert, Wharfdale Road, N1	
1982-12-09	Roger Scruton	anti-socialist	Howard Moss	Woodford Road Sports Ground Pavilion, Guildford	
1984-01-16	Cllr. John France	Labour Party	Ron Cook	Central Library, Alexandra Road, Swansea	
1984-01-19	Lady Olga Maitland	Families for Defence	Steve Coleman	Islington Central Library	
1984-02-16	A. Smith & Harry Phipps	Conservative Monday Club	Dick Donnelly & Clifford Slapper	Prince Albert	
1984-03-13	Mike German & Russell Smart	SDP-Liberal Alliance	Barry McNeeney	Brownhills Hotel, Cardiff	
1984-03-22	Ronald Malone	Fellowship Party	Pat Wilson	SPGB Head Office, Clapham, SW4	
1984-06-07	Andrew Brierley	Federation of Conservative Students	Joe Carter	Islington Central Library	
1984-06-20	Lady Olga Maitland & Virginia Bottomley	Conservative Party	Clifford Slapper & Dick Donnelly	Civic Hall, London Road, Guildford	
1984-07-06	D. Pallet	Conservative Monday Club	Steve Coleman	Marine Hotel, Clacton	
1984-09-13	Tony Kerpel	Conservative Party	Garry Slapper	Islington Central Library, Fieldway Crescent, N1	
1984-10-27	[?]	Communist Workers' Organisation	[?]	Prince Albert	
1984-11-21	John Hoos	Campaign for Nuclear Disarmament	Clifford Slapper	Waggon and Horses, Stapleton Road, Bristol	
1984-11-30	Tom Sackville, MP	Conservative Party	Howard Moss	Bolton Central Library	
1985-01-10	Teresa Gorman	Conservative Party	Steve Coleman	Duke of York, York Way, N1	
1985-02-14	Revd. David Humphrey	Christian	Ron Cook	Duke of York, York Way, N1	
1985-04-04	Cllr. Laurence Spigel	Labour Party	Steve Coleman	Duke of York	
1985-04-25	Roger Stott, MP	Labour Party	Dick Donnelly	Bolton Central Library	
1985-05-10	Colin Tipton	Socialist Workers Party	Steve Coleman	The Star, Quarry Street, Guildford	
1985-05-30	Chris Muir	Social Democratic Party	Clifford Slapper	Manchester Town Hall, Albert Square, Manchester	
1985-06-07	Elliot Morley	Labour Party	Dick Donnelly	Central Community Centre, Lindrum Street, Scunthorpe	
1985-06-20	Paul Backhouse	Peace Through NATO	Dick Donnelly	Duke of York	
1985-06-26	Rev. D. Haslam	Christianity	[?]	Harlesden Methodist Church, High Street, Harlesden, NW10	
1985-07-29	Richard Balfe, MEP	Labour Party	Pieter Lawrence	SPGB Head Office, Clapham, SW4	
1985-09-12	Andrew McIntyre	Campaign for Nuclear Disarmament	Clifford Slapper	Duke of York	
1985-09-25	Norman Barrie	Communist Party of Great Britain	Vic Vanni	Wellgate Central Library, Dundee	
1985-11-14	M. McGregor	Federation of Conservative Students	Steve Coleman	Duke of York	
1985-11-21	Michael Brown, MP	Conservative Party	Clifford Slapper	The Star, Guildford	
1985-11-26	[?]	Ecology Party	Clifford Slapper	Carlton Arms, Seaham	
1985-11-29	David Selbourne	anti-socialist	Ron Cook	The Star	
1985-12-02	Stan Newens, MEP	Labour Party	[?]	SPGB Head Office, Clapham, SW4	
1985-12-10	Rev. J. J. Stephenson	Christianity	Steve Coleman	Carlton Arms, Seaham	
1986-03-07	[?]	Campaign for Nuclear Disarmament	Steve Coleman	Lambeth Town Hall	
1986-03-27	Philip van der Elst	The Freedom Association	Ron Cook	Duke of York	
1986-04-10	John Burton	Institute of Economic Affairs	Clifford Slapper	Duke of York	
1986-05-29	[?]	Militant tendency	Steve Coleman	Scunthorpe Community Centre	
1986-06-12	[?]	Red Action	Dick Donnelly	Duke of York	
1986-08-14	[?]	Green Party	[?]	Duke of York	
1986-09-19	Lady Olga Maitland	Families for Defence	E. Hardy	The Star	
1986-10-22	S. Barker	Green Party	Pieter Lawrence	Millstone, Thomas Street, Manchester	
1986-11-10	Bill Etherington	National Union of Mineworkers	Clifford Slapper	Printers Pie, Pudding Chare, Newcastle	
1986-12-01	Monty Johnstone	Communist Party of Great Britain	Pieter Lawrence	SPGB Head Office, Clapham, SW4	
1986-12-11	G. Webster Gardiner	Conservative Families	Steve Coleman	Duke of York	
1987-02-12	[?]	Black Flag	[?]	Duke of York	
1987-03-02	Alan Bowman	Christian	Sandy Easton	The Broken Doll, Blenheim Street, Newcastle	
1987-03-12	Keith Veness	Labour Party	[?]	Duke of York	
1987-05-08	Piers Merchant, MP	Conservative Party	Clifford Slapper	Guildhall, Quayside, Newcastle	
1987-05-15	Clive Bradley	Socialist Organiser	[?]	Guildford Institute, Ward Street, Guildford	
1987-05-21	Ian Dixon	Communist Party of Great Britain	Steve Coleman	Headingley Community Centre, North Lane, Leeds	
1987-05-29	Prof. Peter Abell	Fabian Society	[?]	Guildford Institute	
1987-06	Sean Mullen	Revolutionary Communist Party	Steve Coleman	Tyneside Cinema, Pilgrim Street, Newcastle	
1987-06-01	Sandy Irvine	Green Party	Steve Dowsett	St. John's Church Hall, Grainger Street, Bolton	
1987-07-09	Andrew Mitchell	Conservative Party	[?]	Duke of York	
1986-08-17	Barney McGill	Labour Party	[?]	St Johns Church Hall, Bolton	
1986-08-20	John Hulton	Green Party	Steve Dowsett	The Liverpool, James Street, Liverpool	
1986-11-19	Lady Olga Maitland	Daily Express	Steve Coleman	Islington Central Library	
1986-11-20	David Clelland, MP	Labour Party	[?]	St Johns Church Hall, Bolton	
1986-11-20	Lindsay Cooke	Green Party	Barry McNeeney	Chiswick Old Town Hall, Turnham Green, W4	
1988-03-10	Chris Pryce	Social Democratic Party	Ralph Critchfield	Duke of York	
1988-05-19	Keith Nathan	Labour Party	Howard Moss	Headingley Community Centre, Leeds	
1988-08-11	Bruce Wallace	Militant tendency	Derek Devine	Wellgate Library, Dundee	
1988-09-08	Kelvin Hopkins	Labour Party	E. Hardy	Duke of York	
1988-09-21	Kelvin Hopkins	Labour Party	Steve Coleman	Luton Central Library	
1988-11-02	Ron Brown, MP	Labour Party	Pieter Lawrence	Lambeth Town Hall	
1988-12-08	Michael Ivens	Aims for Industry	Pieter Lawrence	Duke of York	
1989-02-15	Cllr. David Corkey & Terri Jasper	Labour Party	Tim Kilgallon & Clifford Slapper	Wallsend Town Hall, Wallsend High Street, Wallsend, Tyneside	
1989-03-09	[?]	London Anarchist Workers Group	Steve Coleman	Duke of York	
1989-04-24	Cllr. Leslie Winter	Conservative Party	Steve Coleman	Cricklewood Hotel, Cricklewood Broadway	
1989-05-05	Jeremy Hywel-Davis	Green Party	Adam Buick	Chiswick Town Hall, Heathfield Terrace, W4	
1989-05-11	Michael Ivens	Aims for Industry	Clifford Slapper	Duke of York	
1989-07-06	[?]	Communist Workers' Organisation	[?]	The Liverpool, James Street, Liverpool	
1989-07-19	Jenny Davies	Social Democratic Party	Clifford Slapper	St Georges Square, Luton	
1988-07-31	Rev. Gerald Beauchamp	Christian	Sandy Easton	Prince of Wales, 101 Willesden Lane, NW	
1988-08-10	Gerald Hartop	The Freedom Association	Ron Cook	Duke of York	
1988-09-14	Gary Hawkins	Labour Party	Steve Coleman	Duke of York	
1988-09-22	Terry Liddle	Republic	Gary Jay	Chiswick Town Hall	
1988-10-13	[?]	Ernest Bevin Society	Pieter Lawrence	Chiswick Town Hall	
1988-11-17	Wayne David, MEP	Labour Party	[?]	Swansea Central Library, Alexandra Road, Swansea	
1988-12-14	Tadek Jaski	Solidarity with Solidarity	Steve Coleman	Duke of York	
1990-01-11	Phil Kelly	Tribune	Ralph Critchfield	Duke of York	
1990-02-21	David Milne	Green Party	Richard Headicar	Royal Oak, Corporation Street, Eccles	
1990-02-08	[?]	Iran Communist	[?]	Duke of York	
1990-03-08	Stephen Kreppel	Conservative Party	Richard Headicar	Duke of York	
1990-03-12	Derek Wall	Green Party	Adam Buick	Hope Centre, Hope Chapel Hill, Hotwells, Bristol	
1990-03-15	[?]	Association of World Federalists	Les Cox	Chiswick Town Hall	
1990-03-24	Cathy Pick	Wandsworth Against the Poll Tax	[?]	SPGB Head Office, Clapham, SW4	
1990-04-13	Adrian Lee	Young Conservatives	Dave Perrin	Chiswick Town Hall	
1990-05-10	Michael Collie	Green Party	Pieter Lawrence	Guildford Institute, Ward Street, Guildford	
1990-05-17	Sahib Mutaquim Bleher	Islamic Party of Britain	Sandy Easton	Chiswick Town Hall	
1990-07-19	Jack Lane	Labour Party	Adam Buick	Chiswick Town Hall	
1990-08-09	Mark Douglas	Green Party	Adam Buick	Highbury Roundhouse Community Centre, 71 Ronalds Road, N5	
1990-09-20	Peter Cadogan	anti-socialist	Joe Carter	Chiswick Town Hall	
1990-10-31	Simon Macilwaine	Liberal Alliance	Clifford Slapper	Royal Oak, York Street, W1	
1988-11-14	Martyn Jones, MP	Labour Party	Clifford Slapper	Chiswick Town Hall	
1991-01-17	Mark French	Socialist Campaign for Animal Rights	Richard Headicar	Chiswick Town Hall	
1991-02-07	Paul Derrick	Robert Owen Association	John Usher	Chiswick Town Hall	
1991-03-28	Marc Gordon	International Freedom Association	Dave Perrin	Cleveland Arms, Cleveland Street, W1	
1991-04-18	Brian Summers	New Economic Foundation	Charmian Skelton	Chiswick Town Hall	
1991-06-15	Chris Wilson	Independent Labour Publications	Richard Headicar	Alex Wood Hall, Norfolk Street, Cambridge	
1991-06-26	Prof. John de V. Roberts	World Federalists	Ron Cook	The Liberties Bar, 100 Camden High Street, NW1	
1991-07-31	Julian Lewis	Conservative Party	Steve Coleman	Liberties Bar	
1991-08-13	Fred Harrison	Centre for Incentive Taxation	Adam Buick	Land and Liberty office, 177 Vauxhall Bridge Road, SW1	
1991-09-19	Mark Campanale	Green investment advisor	Pieter Lawrence	Chiswick Town Hall	
1991-09-25	Toby Fiennes	Green Party	Clifford Slapper	Liberties Bar	
1991-10-31	Prof. David Marsland	anti-socialist	Steve Coleman	Chiswick Town Hall	
1992-01-13	John Kemp	Land and Liberty	Joe Carter	SPGB Head Office, Clapham, SW4	
1992-01-17	Barry Macleod-Cullinane	Karl Menger Society	Adam Buick	Chiswick Town Hall	
1992-02-26	Terry Liddle	Labour Party	Steve Coleman	Liberties Bar	
1992-03-20	[?]	Green Anarchist	Richard Headicar	Chiswick Town Hall	
1992-03-25	[?]	Libertarian Alliance	[?]	Liberties Bar	
1992-04-02	Mark Brady	Libertarian Alliance	Adam Buick	Falkland Arms, 31 Bloomsbury Way, WC1	
1992-06-06	Cllr. Roger Lord	Conservative Party	Steve Coleman	Arena Sports and Leisure Club, Circular Road East, Colchester	
1992-06-19	[?]	Socialist Organiser	Sharon Pinner	Chiswick Town Hall	
1992-07-08	Cllr. Ellis Hillman	Labour Party	Steve Coleman	Liberties Bar	
1992-09-18	Paul Coulam	Anti-Federalist League	Sandy Easton	Chiswick Town Hall	
1992-09-25	Bob Layton	Libertarian Alliance	Pieter Lawrence	Beacon Centre, 42a Richmond Road, Kingston	
1991-10-16	Astra Seibe	Green Party	Richard Headicar	Chiswick Town Hall	
1991-11-17	Robert Burrage	New Right	Steve Coleman	West Greenwich House, Greenwich High Street, SE10	
1991-12-06	Wally Bensilum	Liberal Democrats	Pieter Lawrence	The Arena, Colchester	
1993-02-19	Chris Marsh	Peace Tax Campaign	Richard Headicar	Chiswick Town Hall	
1993-03-19	Robert Whelan	Committee on Population	Gwynn Thomas	Chiswick Town Hall	
1993-05-21	Paul Deacon	Transeuropa	John Usher	Chiswick Town Hall	
1993-06-23	Cllr. Roger Hughes	Liberal Democrats	Steve Coleman	Wharncliffe Hotel, Bevercotes Road, Sheffield	
1993-07-28	Sir Robin Williams	Campaign for an Independent Britain	Clifford Slapper	Conway Hall	
1993-10-14	Charles Secrett	Friends of the Earth	Pieter Lawrence	Empress of Russia, 362 St John Street, EC1	
1993-11-11	John Papworth	Fourth World Review	[?]	Empress of Russia	
1993-12-02	Niall O'Connor	Troops Out Movement	Richard Headicar	Islington Central Library	
1993-12-02	Rev. Angela Robinson	Christian Socialist	[?]	Arena, Colchester	
1993-12-09	Stan Newens, MEP	Labour Party	Steve Coleman	Friends House, 175-177 Euston Road, NW1	
1994-01-21	Lord Desai	Labour Party	Adam Buick	Chiswick Town Hall	
1994-04-27	Jerry Hayes, MP	Conservative Party	Dick Donnelly	Conway Hall	
1994-05-06	[?]	Communist Workers' Organisation	Sandy Easton	Chiswick Town Hall	
1994-05-20	Niki Kort Velyessy	Green Party	Clifford Slapper	Kensington Central Library, Phillimore Walk, W8	
1994-05-26	[?]	Communist Workers' Organisation	Dave Perrin	Three Cranes Hotel, 74 Queen Street, Sheffield	
1994-06-01	Michael Meadowcroft	Liberal Party	Clifford Slapper	Conway Hall	
1994-06-04	Richard W. Bourne	Fabian Society	Steve Coleman	Arena, Colchester	
1994-09-25	Keith Brown	Scottish National Party	Dick Donnelly	15 Brunswick Street, Edinburgh	
1994-11-21	R. Cuper	Labour Campaign for Electoral Reform	Jacek Krauze	Chiswick Town Hall	
1994-11-24	Pat Murphy	Socialist Organiser	Adam Buick	Sheffield Centre Against Unemployment, 73 West Street, Sheffield	
1993-12-19	Denis O'Keefe	free-marketer	Steve Coleman	Chiswick Town Hall	
1995-01-15	Cllr. Donnachadh McCarthy	Liberal Democrats	Adam Buick	SPGB Head Office, Clapham, SW4	
1995-02-02	[?]	Green Party	Pieter Lawrence	Arena, Colchester	
1995-02-22	Judy Maciejowska	Campaign for Political Ecology	Pieter Lawrence	Beacon Centre, 42 Richmond Road, Kingston, Surrey	
1995-11-15	Nick Best	Green Party	John Bissett	Newcastle University	
1995-02-27	Michael Hayman	Young Conservatives	Chris McColl	Three Cranes Hotel, 74 Queen Street, Sheffield	
1995-03-17	Phillip Loads	free-marketer	Richard Headicar	Chiswick Town Hall	
1995-03-19	Terry Liddle	Labour Party	Richard Headicar	SPGB Head Office, Clapham, SW4	
1995-03-28	[?]	Green Party	Pieter Lawrence	Brighthelm Centre, North Road, Brighton	
1995-04-14	Tom Rigby	Alliance for Workers' Liberty	Nigel McCullough	Conway Hall	
1995-04-23	Robert Corfe	Full Employment League	Pat Deutz	SPGB Head Office, Clapham, SW4	
1995-05-18	Jamal Harwood	Luton Cultural Islamic Society	Richard Headicar	University of Luton, Park Square, Luton	
1995-05-19	David Cairns	Christian Socialist Movement	Adam Buick	Chiswick Town Hall	
1993-05-30	[?]	Campaign for Nuclear Disarmament	Steve Coleman	Brighthelm Centre, Brighton	
1993-06-05	[?]	International Marxist Convention	[?]	Chiswick Town Hall	
1993-07-26	David Senior	Conservative Party	Clifford Slapper	Conway Hall	
1991-09-24	David Reid	anti-socialist	Cyril Evans	SPGB Head Office, Clapham, SW4	
1988-09-27	Tony Pearce	Christian	Ron Cook	Conway Hall	
1986-10-25	Mark Osborn	Alliance for Workers' Liberty	Adam Buick	University of London Union, Malet Street, WC1	
1986-11-02	[?]	Friends of Bosnia Society	Brian Johnson	Students Union	
1995-11-19	[?]	Reclaim the Streets	[?]	SPGB Head Office, Clapham, SW4	
1995-12-06	[?]	Alliance for Workers' Liberty	[?]	St Enoch Hotel, Howard Street, Glasgow	
1996-03-13	Cllr. Ed Young	Conservative Party	Clifford Slapper	Royal Holloway University, Egham, Surrey	
1996-04-07	Dan Wheatley	Association of World Federalists	Vic Vanni	SPGB Head Office, Clapham, SW4	
1996-06-17	Richard Laming	Federal Union	Dave Flynn	Chiswick Town Hall	
1996-09-25	Sir Teddy Taylor	Conservative Party	Clifford Slapper	Lambeth Town Hall, Acre Lane, SW	
1996-11-24	Andrew Sawdon	Liberal Democrats	Richard Headicar	SPGB Head Office, Clapham, SW4	
1997-02-17	[?]	Socialist Labour Party	Dave Flynn	Chiswick Town Hall	
1997-04-25	Dominic Hobson	Conservative Party	Peter Maloney	Conway Hall	
1998-03-16	[?]	Mebyon Kernow	[?]	The Yacht Club, Promenade, Penzance	
1997-04-27	Dorene Robinson	Green Party	Vincent Otter	The Yacht Club, Penzance	
1997-04-28	Paul Holmes	Liberal Party	Vincent Otter	Community Centre, South Terrace, Camborne, Cornwall	
1997-06-04	Sir Richard Body, MP	Conservative Party	Dave Flynn	Conway Hall	
1997-06-05	Andrew George, MP	Liberal Democrats	Dick Donnelly	YMCA, Alverton Road, Penzance	
1996-09-07	Cllr. Phil Andrews	local politician	[?]	Chiswick Town Hall	
1999-02-17	Alison Williams	Commission on Global Governance	Clifford Slapper	Marchmont Community Centre, 62 Marchmont Street, WC1	
1999-11-06	Kate Buckell	Alliance for Workers' Liberty	Dave Flynn	Caxton House, St Johns Way, N19	
2000-07-17	Naomi McPherson	The Alternative Approach	Stuart Watkins	SPGB Head Office, Clapham, SW4	
2003-07-08	Richard Balfe, MEP	Conservative Party	Sandy Easton	Conway Hall	
2006-10-09	UCL Debating Society	pro-war on terror	Bill Martin	University College London	
2008-09-20	Ian Bone	Class War	Howard Moss	SPGB Head Office, Clapham, SW4	
2009-02-28	Magnus Nielsen	United Kingdom Independence Party	Danny Lambert	SPGB Head Office, Clapham, SW4	
2010-02-04	Eamonn Butler	Adam Smith Institute	Richard Headicar	Conway Hall	
2012-07-22	Steve Duffield and Francesco	The Zeitgeist Movement	Dick Field and Adam Buick	Irish Cultural Centre, Hammersmith, W6	
2012-09-05	Ben Dyson	Positive Money	Adam Buick	Conway Hall	
2014-03-26	Elizabeth Jones	United Kingdom Independence Party	Bill Martin	SPGB Head Office, Clapham, SW4	
2015-03-09	Ashley Wakeling	Wales Green Party	Brian Johnson	Unitarian Church, Swansea	
