= Socialist Propaganda League =

- Spokesperson: Henry Martin
- Founded: 1911
- Dissolved: 1951
- Split from: Socialist Party of Great Britain
- Newspaper: The Voice

The Socialist Propaganda League was a tiny socialist group active in London from about 1911 to 1951.

== History ==
The League was formed as a result of an early dispute in the Socialist Party of Great Britain and of the optimistic belief of the Party's founder members that the socialist revolution was near. A group of members around Henry Martin and Augustus Snellgrove wanted the Party to take a definitive stand on the attitude socialist delegates elected to parliament or local councils would take towards reform measures proposed by one or more of the capitalist parties.

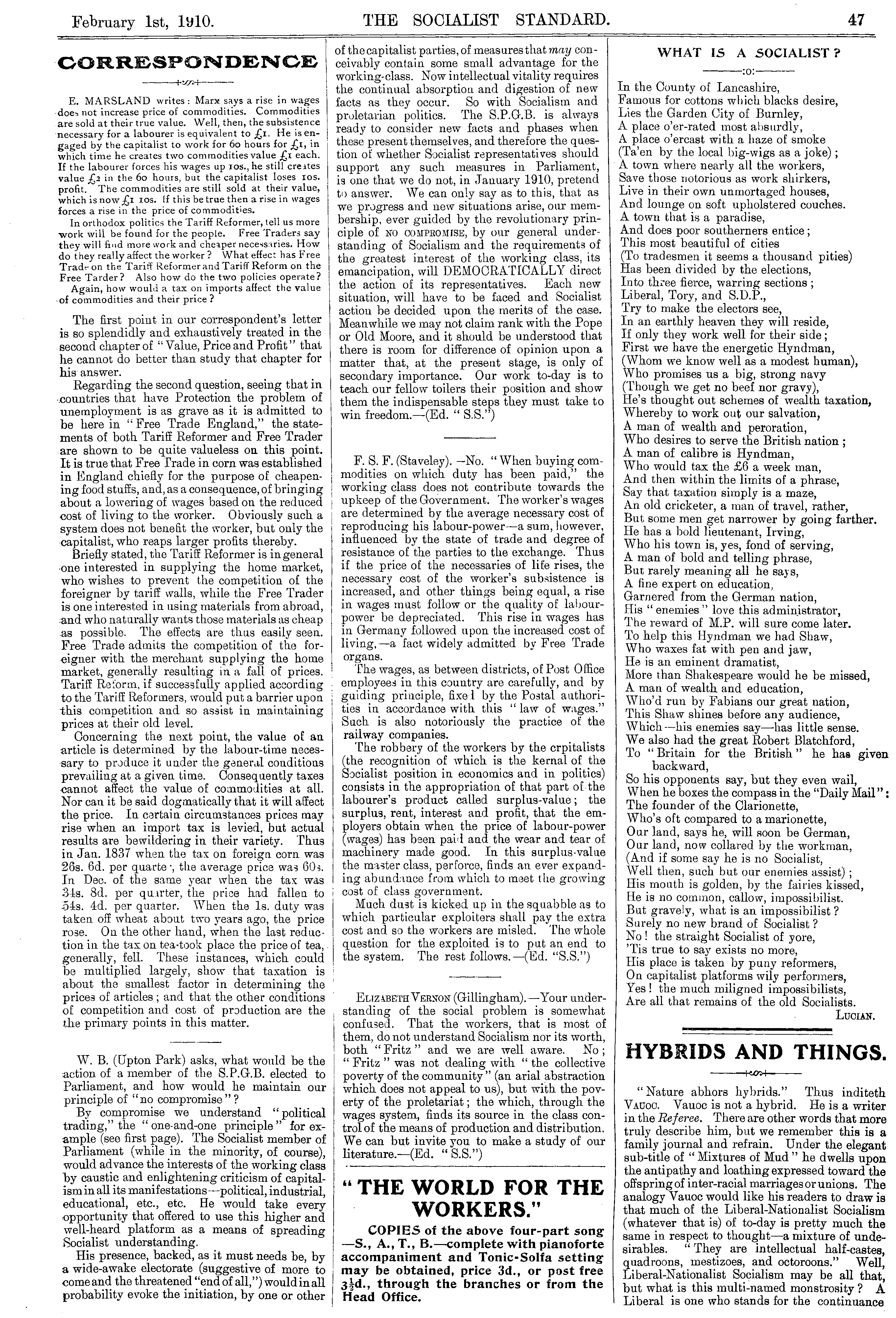
Socialist Standard 1910 February WB Upton Park

In February 1910 a letter from "W.B. (Upton Park)" was sent to the Socialist Standard asking: "What would be the attitude of a member of the SPGB if elected to Parliament, and how would he maintain the principle of 'No Compromise'?" The perspective of this small group of members was that no reform of capitalism could ever be supported by the party claiming to represent working-class interests, as it was not the job of socialists to take part in the running of capitalism. Any attempt to do so would run counter to the famous hostility clause of the party's Declaration of Principles. The Standard's reply on the matter, backed by the party's Executive Committee (EC), stated that "each issue would have to be looked at on its merits and the course to be pursued decided democratically." This did not satisfy the members who had raised the question, who formed a Provisional Committee aimed at overturning the position espoused in the Standard's reply and who set their case out in an open letter to party members, arguing that socialists were required to oppose measures introduced by capitalist parties on each and every occasion. This was again rebutted firmly by the EC who contended that it would be ridiculous for socialists, by way of example, to oppose a measure designed to stop a war in which the working class was being butchered.

Believing this approach to be a violation of the principle of no compromise, several members resigned over this issue during 1911, a small number going on to found the Socialist Propaganda League. The SPL's principal speaker and writer was Henry Martin, Snellgrove having been one of those from the Provisional Committee later to rejoin the SPGB. Though Martin was sympathetic to the SPGB in all other respects, he continued to denounce its willingness to engage in ‘political trading’ in pamphlets and on the outdoor platform until his death in 1951.

== Publications ==
- From Slavery to Freedom. Socialist Propaganda League. 1932. OCLC 786420406.
- Economics of Labour: A Lecture by Harry Quelch. Socialist Propaganda League. OCLC 215500152.

== See also ==
- Socialist Studies (1989)
