= Jim D'Arcy (socialist) =

- Born: James D'Arcy; 22 September 1919; Glasgow, Scotland
- Died: 2 February 2001 (aged 81); Camden, London, England
- Years active: 1943–2001
- Known for: Socialist Party of Great Britain; Socialist Studies
- Notable work: Marxism in the 21st Century
- Spouse: Olive Blomeley (m. 1946)

James D'Arcy (22 September 1919 – 2 February 2001) was a British socialist born in Glasgow. His father was a founding member of Glasgow branch. Jim joined the Socialist Party of Great Britain in 1943 and later his wife Olive and two sons joined. He became a speaker for the party and represented the party in many Socialist Party of Great Britain debates. In the 1950s, he provided much of the material and labour to make necessary renovations to head office. He travelled on the tour of North America on behalf of the party. He was central organiser, executive committee member and also branch secretary. He was party candidate in the 1977 Greater London Council election and wrote many articles for Socialist Standard before helping found Socialist Studies in 1989/1991. No obituary was ever carried in the Socialist Standard.

== See also ==
- Edgar Hardcastle
- Cyril May

== Bibliography ==
- Marxism in the 21st Century. Socialist Studies. 2010. OCLC 614642665.
