= Frank Erni Dawkins =

English political activist

Frank Erni Dawkins (August 1873 – 26 December 1945) was an English political activist known for advocating wealth redistribution, strong public programmes, and policies supporting the nationalisation of key industries. His political career included a 1909 assault in Ilford, highlighting the tensions between socialism and religious views. Dawkins' advocacy for socialism spanned from economics to community engagement. He represented the Labour Party in Hampstead in the 1929 general election. Dawkins's Methodist background and political career is a classic example of the early 20th century transition from methodism to socialism in the context of the view taken by some observers that 'socialism owes more to Methodism than Marxism'.

== Early life ==
Frank Erni Dawkins was born in Blackpool, and as the son of a Methodist minister, he was relocated over ten times during his childhood due to the Methodist circuit system, primarily in the North of England. Dawkins had a strong Methodist and temperance upbringing and intended to follow in his fathers footsteps and enter the ministry but was prevented by economic circumstances. The 1891 Census of Great Britain records his occupation as an apprentice cabinet maker aged 18 and he is resident in Chelmsford where his father had been previously posted and Dawkins had been organist at the Royal Well Chapel there. In 1896 he lived in Bedford and was an organist for the Bedford Temperance Choir. In 1898 Dawkins was appointed as organist at Williamson Street Primitive Methodist Chapel, Hull

== Political awakening ==
Aside from being an organist, Dawkins began his career as a shop worker in Hull and was dismissed by his employer when he tried to organise shop assistants into the NASU in the North of England. He moved to London and was inspired by Keir Hardie in South West Ham and Hardie's Methodist underpinning of socialism. Dawkins became active in the North West Ham branch of the Independent Labour Party which Hardie played a large part in establishing and later the Ilford Socialist Party. Dawkins continued his interest in championing the cause of shopworkers, particularly criticising the so-called ‘living-in’ system.

== Political views and activity ==
=== Economics ===
As a socialist, Dawkins consistently advocated redistributing wealth and resources to reduce income inequality and promote social welfare. He believed in the importance of strong public programs, such as healthcare and education, funded by progressive taxation. Dawkins was critical of free-market capitalism, arguing that it led to exploitation and widening income disparities. He often called for nationalising key industries to ensure that essential services would be accessible to all citizens.

=== Ilford Socialist Party ===
The Ilford Socialist Party held meetings to protest against the living-in system for shopworkers, chaired by Dawkins.

In 1904 the Ilford Socialist Party reported the establishment of the Socialist Party of Great Britain and the stronger discipline of the SPGB attracted ISP Members such as Jack Kent.

Dawkins also joined the Socialist Party of Great Britain in 1905 having previously been Sec. N.W. Ham Branch of the Independent Labour Party., and Organising Sec. Ilford Socialist Party. This effectively established the Romford Branch of the SPGB with J H Kennett Chairman of the Ilford Socialist Party becoming Chairman of this SPGB Branch.

=== Socialist Party of Great Britain ===
Dawkins was member number 244 and he became active in the public speaking activities of the party. Regular speaking SPGB schedules noting F E Dawkins also included Jack Fitzgerald, Hans Neumann, Jack Kent, Thomas A Jackson and Alexander Anderson.

The Commune of Paris was regularly celebrated by Dawkins and the SPGB with such talks including 21 March 1907 at Latchmere Baths, Battersea. During his period with the SPGB Dawkins made a strong case for the SPGB's call for revolution and the so-called impossibilism case. Writing in the Socialist Standard in 1906 he highlighted a speech by Lord Avebury where Avebury warned of revolution by the working class if wages weren't soon increased, hours reduced and defence spending cut to pay for the improvements. Dawkins cited this attitude as evidence that only revolution would bring such changes, not reform. Dawkins went on to critique both the Independent Labour Party and the emergent Labour Party and their willingness to acquiesce to seek reform. Dawkins closed the article by calling "Let the workers of the world organise for Socialism and refuse to be drawn from the straight path. ‘Something now’ will be attained not by agitating for reform but by organising for revolution." However, Dawkins did apparently acquiesce towards reform post WW1 and worked to support the Labour Party in its early years, including representing Labour in Hampstead.

=== Cycling Tour ===
In the November 1906 issue of the Socialist Standard, an account of a cycling tour is given. The tour started in London and visited Bedford, Northampton, Leicester, Loughborough, Nottingham, Derby, Kettering and Luton promoting the interests of the Socialist Party of Great Britain (SPGB) though public speaking. The account, in a diary format, details the various stops and experiences during the week-long 150-mile cycling journey and gives an insight to the challenges of undertaking such a venture.

=== 1909 assault ===
At a meeting in Ilford, a Protestant lecturer A. M. Stones began criticising socialism, associating it with anarchism, atheism, and free love. Dawkins criticised the use of religion to support capitalism and argued that "free love" was not exclusive to socialism and using a news story of an alleged scandal implied that his interlocutor was involved in such activities, regardless of his religious beliefs. This revelation was met with mixed reactions from the audience.

While Dawkins' arguments persuaded some audience members, others, primarily the Christian attendees, reacted with hostility. This caused a furore that forced the meeting to be disbanded. To protect Dawkins from potential harm, around thirty to forty Dawkins supporters escorted him to a local club. However, later that night, three individuals attacked Dawkins. One of the assailants struck him with a cudgel.

Despite the assault, Dawkins continued participating in socialist activities, appearing at a subsequent event. The incident served to weaken the cause of anti-socialists in Ilford.

=== Relocation to Southend-upon-Sea ===
In 1911, upon moving to Southend-on-Sea, Dawkins quickly introduced the Socialist Party to its local community. Dawkins began holding regular propaganda meetings on Southend's Marine Parade. These events attracted large audiences and generated demand for socialist literature.

=== Labour Party ===
In 1926 Dawkins joined the Labour Party in South Paddington but did not work there when he discovered the communist leanings of the then chairman Reginald Bishop. In 1927 he was a regular speaker at Whitestone Pond on Hampstead Heath.

=== 1926 General Strike ===
Following the 1926 General Strike 4–12 May 1926 Dawkins devoted himself to the cause of the locked out miners for the rest of the year, speaking in support of their cause in locations that included Aylesbury, Eastbourne, Bedford and the Midlands.

=== 1929 General Election ===
In the 1929 general election, Dawkins represented the Labour Party in the Hampstead constituency. He was supported in his campaign by Ishbel MacDonald daughter of Ramsay MacDonald and also Charles Cripps the 1st Baron Parmoor.

In the pre-election public meetings, Dawkins described parliament as a band of conspirators. He claimed there was a conspiracy against international peace and predicted that with Conservatives in power it would not be long before a war. Dawkins claimed that St John Ambulance were already being trained for air raids and gas attacks. Dawkins said Labour would work for international peace. Dawkins claimed that Great Britain and France were the greatest disturbers of peace in the world. This latter point ‘roused adverse and heated opinions’ amongst the audience. On other matters he said that he would support all bills preventing cruelty to animals, home rule for India and adequate old age pensions. Each candidate was also asked about their view on the Covenant of the League of Nations. Dawkins asserted his agreement and support but, noting how he had advocated peace at the start of WW1 when it was not a comfortable position to hold, he went on to say that he saw no hope of peace until there was a Labour Government and ‘honest men at the Foreign Office.’

Dawkins received 8,473 votes, amounting to 21.1% of the total votes cast, a slight increase of 0.2% from the previous election. However, Dawkins was unsuccessful in securing the Hampstead seat, as the Unionist candidate George Balfour won the election with 23,370 votes, representing 58.3% of the total votes. The Liberal candidate, M. Leon Freedman, finished closely behind Dawkins with 8,273 votes, accounting for 20.6% of the votes. The Unionist party maintained its hold on the Hampstead seat with a majority of 14,897 votes or 37.1% of the total. The voter turnout for this election was 62.8%, a decrease of 4.4% compared to the previous election.

=== Debating ===
Dawkins participated in debates as a representative of the Socialist Party of Great Britain (SPGB). On 4 April 1910, F.E. Dawkins debated against Mr Wimbourne from the Liberal Party in Manor Park, London.

Debate was also undertaken between socialist factions. The Bishopsgate Institute holds a handbill advertising a debate headed 'Revolution or Reform' and scheduled for 18 November 1908 with F. H. Gorle of the formative British Socialist Party tagged as a reformer and Dawkins of the SPBG tagged as a revolutionist. The debate took place at the Labour Church in Durban Road Watford that Gorle had founded.

Debates became a more significant part of the SPGB's activities in the 1930s and continued to be crucial until the 1980s. F.E. Dawkins was an early participant. Dawkins's involvement in the 1910 debate suggests they played a part in promoting the SPGB's doctrines and message during the early stages of the party's history. The SPGB's outdoor speaking came to an end in 1914 with the onset of the First World War and clashes with pro-war audiences. Dawkins later noted the uncomfortable position in advocating peace at this time.

== Personal life ==
Dawkins met Lois Roe when campaigning against the living-in system for shop workers. Roe was retained under the living-in system at a drapers shop in Hoxton. They married on 28 February 1903 and had four children and the family home was in Bedford a town where Dawkins had lived previously. They divorced on 14 November 1924. In 1925 Dawkins married Minnie Peacock and they had one child. At the outbreak of World War 2 Dawkins relocated to Halifax, Yorkshire.

=== Employment ===
On coming to London around the turn of the century Dawkins was employed as a furniture buyer at Cohen Barnett and Sons in Curtain Lane, London. In 1923 he established his own carpet importing business nearby in Camomile Street called F.E. Dawkins and Co. and later worked on a freelance basis.

=== World War 1 ===
In the First World War Dawkins's employers went into war production with aeroplane propellers. This association with the formative naval and army air divisions (pre RAF) led to a heightened awareness of the Zeppelin attacks. On 1 October 1916 when a significant zeppelin raid was expected in North London, Dawkins took his family north towards Potters Bar for safety. However, Zeppelin LZ72 drifted north away from London and was shot down at Potters Bar, crashing in full view of the fleeing family.

=== Death ===
Dawkins died in Halifax on 26 December 1945, at the age of 72.
