= Thomas Kemp =

Thomas Kemp may refer to:

- Thomas Read Kemp (1783–1844), English property developer and politician
- Thomas Webster Kemp (1866–1928), Royal Navy admiral
- Thomas Kemp of the Kemp baronets
- Thomas Kemp (shipbuilder)
- Tom Kemp (1921–1993), Marxist economic historian and political theorist
- Tommy Kemp (1915–2004), England rugby union player
- T. S. Kemp (Thomas Stainforth Kemp), British palaeontologist
