= Con Lehane =

Con Lehane may refer to:

- Con Lehane (socialist) (1877–1919), socialist active in the Irish Socialist Republican Party, the Social Democratic Federation, and the Socialist Party of Great Britain
- Con Lehane (Irish republican) (1911–1983), member of the IRA Army Council and member of Dáil Éireann
