= Socialist Studies (1989) =

- Founders: Edgar Hardcastle, Cyril May, Jim D'Arcy, Harry Young, Harry Baldwin and eleven others
- Founded: 1989
- Split from: Socialist Party of Great Britain
- Headquarters: London
- Ideology: Socialism; Classical Marxism; Impossibilism
- International affiliation: World Socialist Party of India (2003–2014)
- Colors: Red
- Slogan: "The establishment of a system of society based upon the common ownership and democratic control of the means and instruments for producing and distributing wealth by and in the interest of the whole community"

Website
- socialiststudies.org.uk

Socialist Studies is the name of a quarterly socialist periodical and of the group which publishes it. The group was founded in 1991 by sixteen expelled members of the Socialist Party of Great Britain (SPGB) who claim that their expulsions were the result of an anti-socialist conspiracy. Though small, the group has remained an active and vocal critic of the SPGB since its inception.

== The publication ==
Socialist Studies
- Cover of Socialist Studies № 1
- Type: Quarterly periodical
- Format: A5
- Owner: Socialist Studies
- Publisher: Socialist Studies
- Editor: Richard Lloyd
- Founded: 1989
- Political alignment: Socialist
- Language: English
- Headquarters: London
- Circulation: <100
- ISSN: 2398-1512
- OCLC number: 723683944
- Website: socialiststudies.org.uk

Socialist Studies was first published in 1989 by the Camden and North West London branches of the Socialist Party of Great Britain (SPGB), though since issue No. 3 (1991) it has been published by an independent organisation. The early issues consisted primarily of material reprinted from the works of Karl Marx and the Socialist Standard, though the paper now consists of original material. The format has remained the same for the past fifteen years, namely three to twelve A4 sheets of single-column word-processed text, photocopied and folded to produce an A5 booklet. The publication is text-only, with no graphics or photographs, none of the articles have a byline and until the No. 35 (Spring 2000) none of the issues were dated.

== The group ==
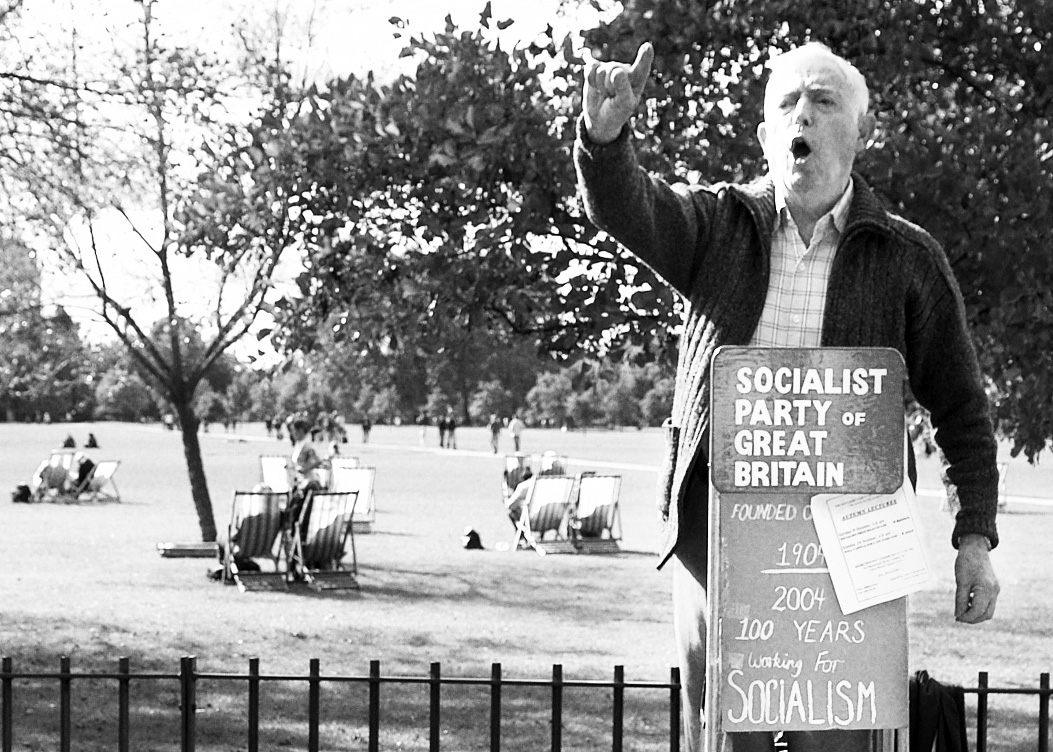
Harry Baldwin

The history of the group now known as Socialist Studies dates to 1991, when the Camden and North West London branches were expelled from the SPGB in a party-wide referendum. Some of these ex members, comprising sixteen individuals, refused to recognise the expulsions and attempted to continue operating as the SPGB, which they claimed to have "reconstituted". Among them were Edgar Hardcastle and Cyril May, who became their central organiser. As the original SPGB had never been dissolved and indeed continued to operate following the expulsions, it successfully mounted various legal challenges against Socialist Studies's use of the SPGB name. Because of this and to differentiate itself from the original SPGB, the group has variously referred to itself in its publicity material as the Reconstituted Socialist Party of Great Britain, the New Socialist Party of Great Britain and Socialist Studies. Third parties refer to them as the Socialist Studies group.

The group's activity consists primarily of publishing Socialist Studies and various pamphlets and holding occasional propaganda meetings. Socialist Studies was not a registered political party until December 2006, when they registered with the Electoral Commission as Socialist Studies Party (1904). As of 2015, they have never contested a local, national, or European Union election.

=== Differences with the Socialist Party of Great Britain ===
Socialist Studies adopted the object and principles of the SPGB and thus claims to hold that party's general ideology and stance on most social, economic and political issues. However, there are several ideological and practical differences between Socialist Studies and the SPGB, most of which arise from the former's narrower interpretation of the object and principles and its views on how strictly these interpretations must be adhered to. For the matters discussed in this section, Socialist Studies generally adopts the position that anyone who does not hold their interpretation cannot be regarded as a true socialist. On the other hand, the SPGB holds that at least some of the following issues are ones upon which genuine socialists may disagree with each other; disagreement with the majority position does not automatically disqualify one from being a socialist or from membership in the party. Socialist Studies's less accommodating stance has been labelled "doctrinaire", a characterisation which they categorically reject.

==== Political franchise ====
The principal ideological disagreement Socialist Studies has with the SPGB is its attitude towards attempts by workers living under political dictatorships to establish elementary democratic and trade union rights, especially in Eastern Europe in the 1980s and early 1990s. The stance of the SPGB since 1939 is summarised by the following 1990 party conference resolution:

This Conference re-affirms the stand taken in the September [actually October] 1939 Socialist Standard and repeated in the September 1989 Socialist Standard, that the Socialist Party of Great Britain wholeheartedly supports the efforts of workers everywhere to secure democratic rights against the powers of suppression. Whilst we avoid any association with parties or political groups seeking to administer capitalism, we emphasise that freedom of movement and expression, the freedom to organise in trade unions, to organise politically, and to participate in elections, are of great importance to all workers and are vital to the success of the socialist movement.

On the other hand, Socialist Studies regards the struggle by workers living under a dictatorship to establish some measure of political democracy as a reformist struggle which socialists should oppose. They believe that the difference between democratic capitalist governments and dictatorial capitalist governments is of no significance to workers, that political democracy is not essential for the propagation of socialist ideas and that workers in dictatorships should not directly confront the forces of suppression. Instead, Socialist Studies believes that they must be "hostile to such movements for democracy and to call on workers to form instead a socialist political party based on [their] principles".

The SPGB does not consider Socialist Studies's position to be incompatible with socialism, but rather simply a different (albeit illogical) interpretation of its principles:

Indifference to moves by workers to try to establish a minimum of political democracy has, once again, been a minority position within the SPGB though not a matter for expulsion. If [a companion party] were to adopt this position, we could live with it and would not consider it a matter for its exclusion from the World Socialist Movement (though we would reserve the right to criticise it as illogical).

==== Cooperation with capitalist law ====
Despite calling for the establishment of socialist political parties, Socialist Studies believes that such parties should not engage in political action which requires use of or active cooperation with what they call "capitalist law" or "bourgeois legislation". This arises from their interpretation of Clause 8 of their Declaration of Principles. That clause states that "Socialist Studies [...] enters the field of political action". The group interprets this as specifically excluding "legal or moral action" and as "overrid[ing] any other consideration". In light of this, they accuse the SPGB of being capitalist collaborators for having registered with the Electoral Commission, which is a legal requirement to contest elections in the United Kingdom. Nonetheless, members of the group had previously registered as candidates for parliamentary and council elections when they were members of the SPGB and the group itself eventually registered with the Electoral Commission. The group as a whole has also occasionally appealed to the state's legal institutions, such as their 1994 lawsuit against the Britannia Building Society. They have also accused others of "criminal libel" and have repeatedly indicated that they are prepared to sue, if necessary.

==== Party name ====
The SPGB had been using the short form of its name, the Socialist Party, for publicity purposes as far back as 1910. In 1988, the party passed a resolution at its annual conference indicating when to use the full-form and short-form names: the full-form name was to be retained as the official name for use on legal documents and publication credits and the short form was to be used for most other purposes, including election ballots and propaganda. This is analogous to how the Conservative and Unionist Party publicises itself as the Conservative Party. The resolution was made partly to codify an existing practice and partly to avoid what some members considered the nationalistic connotation of Great Britain.

Socialist Studies interprets the 1988 resolution as having completely changed the party's name and proscribing the use of the full form. They see this resolution as conflicting with the party's Declaration of Principles, one clause of which mentions the party's full name explicitly. It is largely on this basis that they justified their continued operation as the Socialist Party of Great Britain, claiming that they were expelled from the Socialist Party, not the Socialist Party of Great Britain. They also claim that they are entitled to use the name because the original Socialist Party of Great Britain no longer exists:

The Socialist Party of Great Britain of 52 Clapham High Street, London SW4 7UN, is defunct and no longer exists as a political party. It does not produce political literature, hold propaganda meetings or contest elections. It cannot exist merely as a name without a body. [...] We are the only political organisation in this country bearing the title 'The Socialist Party of Great Britain'.

More recently, the 1988 resolution was reversed at a conference in 2008.

==== Reformism ====
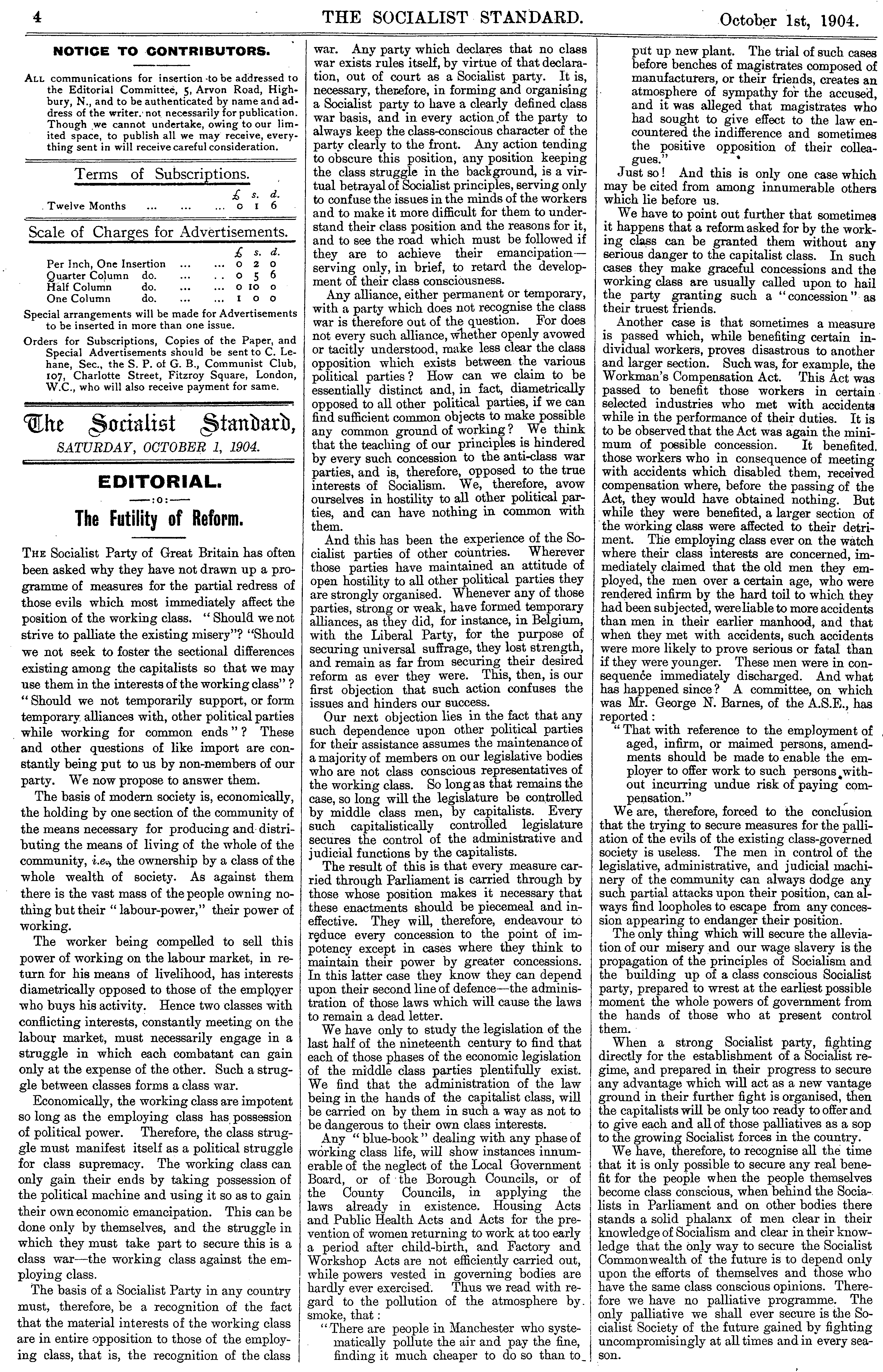
Socialist Standard, October 1904, editorial "The Futility of Reform"

The SPGB has a longstanding position that it is "opposed to a reform programme and to reformist organisations, but not opposed to reforms as such". Hence, the party does not campaign for reforms itself since its sole object is the establishment of socialism, but it is not opposed to reforms passed by the government when they are clearly in the interests of the working class. The Socialist Studies group disagrees with this position, explicitly stating that socialist Members of Parliament should vote against reform measures even when they are in the interests of the working class.

The SPGB considers Socialist Studies's position on how socialist Members of Parliament should vote to be "a legitimate position for a socialist to hold, even though it is not the one that, as a matter of historical fact, has been adopted by the SPGB" and "do[es] not regard it as a matter for serious dispute".

==== Abolition of the state ====
Socialist Studies accuses the SPGB of coming under the influence of anarchist ideas and not sufficiently emphasising the parliamentary aspect of the socialist revolution. Socialist Studies claims that the SPGB's position is that the state would be abolished immediately upon the overthrow of class society whereas Socialist Studies's position is that the state would "gradually wither away" instead. Referring to the SPGB's 1984 conference resolution (since rescinded) that "Socialism will entail the immediate abolition of and not the gradual decline of the State", Socialist Studies writes:

If you are in favour of the immediate abolition of the State when Socialism is established then you are in favour of its immediate abolition here and now, which is of course the anarchist position. [...] Unless Socialists use the power of the machinery of government to dispossess the capitalist class they will be unable to establish Socialism. We find it inconceivable that intelligent Socialists of a future generation would even consider such an act of monumental stupidity.

A page from The Clapham-based Socialist Party – Just Another Capitalist Party, one of dozens of Socialist Studies publications attacking the Socialist Party of Great Britain

=== Relations with the Socialist Party of Great Britain ===
Much of the material published by Socialist Studies is highly critical and often outright contemptuous of the SPGB, which it refers to as the "Clapham-based Socialist Party" or the "Socialist Party of Clapham". The group variously claims that the SPGB is anarchist, reformist, capitalist, fascist, Stalinist, Trotskyist, undemocratic and democracy fetishist. According to Socialist Studies, the SPGB colludes with the Electoral Commission to "prevent Socialists [from] carrying out political propaganda on the web" and does this because its own propaganda is not being read as widely as that of Socialist Studies. Socialist Studies also claims that the SPGB has a secret de facto leadership of "godfathers", who conspire to suppress socialist ideas and to destroy Socialist Studies.

Socialist Studies has repeatedly called on the SPGB to respond to some of these accusations and to engage in debates on their ideological differences. However, as these calls were made at the time Socialist Studies was still claiming to be the Socialist Party of Great Britain, the SPGB refused to recognise their legitimacy. The only official published comment the SPGB has made on the Socialist Studies group has been in an article devoted to the history of breakaway groups in the centenary issue of the Socialist Standard, which described them as "a small group of rather disgruntled ex-members".

=== Publications ===
==== Print ====
See pamphlets

- Socialist Studies 1 (1989) to 107 (2018). Socialist Studies. OCLC 723683944.
- 1904-2004 A Century of Political Struggle (2004)
- War and Capitalism (1996, 2000, 2005) OCLC 877116865
- Materialist Conception of History. Socialist Studies. 1995. OCLC 863340060.
- The Communist Manifesto in the 21st Century. Socialist Studies. 1998. OCLC 40499662.
- New Labour, A Party of Capitalism. Socialist Studies. 2005 [2000]. OCLC 51075172.
- Socialist Policies and Principles: Setting the Record Straight. Socialist Studies. 2002. OCLC 71777907.
- Capitalism causes War and Terrorism. Socialist Studies. 2005 [2002]. OCLC 914627936.
- Socialism versus Religion, War and Capitalism (2007)
- Marxism in the 21st Century. Socialist Studies. 2010. OCLC 614642665.

==== Online only ====
See pamphlet index

- "Barriers to Socialism"
- "The Capitalist Class and the Ruling Class"
- "The Reality of Chinese Capitalism"
- "Impossibility of Anarchism"

== See also ==
- World Socialist Party of India
