= Ernest John Bartlett Allen =

British socialist

E. J. B. Allen
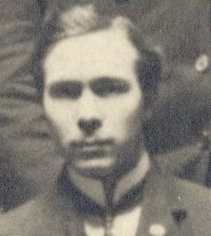
- E. J. B. Allen at the SPGB 1905 Conference
- Born: 29 March 1884; South Hinksey, Berkshire
- Died: 16 June 1945 (aged 61); Auckland
- Political party: Socialist Party of Great Britain
- Movement: World Socialist Movement
- Spouse: Matilda Allen (née Andrews)

Ernest John Bartlett Allen (29 March 1884 – 16 June 1945) was a British socialist active in the United Kingdom and New Zealand.

Allen was born in South Hinksey, Berkshire (now Oxfordshire) and graduated from Oxford University. He joined the Social Democratic Federation in 1900, and in May 1904 participated in the Provisional Committee which led to the founding in June of the Socialist Party of Great Britain. During the first few years of its existence Allen was very active in the SPGB, speaking at both indoor and outdoor venues and writing for the Socialist Standard. He was also a member of the Executive Committee from 1905 to 1906, secretary of Fulham branch from 1904 to 1906, and Chairman of the Party's first Conference in April 1905.

Allen was in favour of setting up socialist trade unions, a policy which was gradually defeated, and in line with this in mid-1906 he joined the Socialist Labour Party. Although this was contrary to Party rules his membership was allowed to lapse on 23 October 1906 rather than being expelled. His final connection with the SPGB was on 20 January 1907 when he represented the SLP in a debate with Jack Fitzgerald in Plumstead.

In 1907 he was a leading member of the British Advocates of Industrial Unionism, being editor of their journal The Industrial Unionist and London Branches Secretary. He was expelled in 1908 for anti-parliamentarianism. Taking with him six London branches, the Tredegar branch, and assorted members, he formed the Industrialist League. He was National Organiser of this group, editor of The Industrialist, and wrote their pamphlet Revolutionary Unionism in 1909. Associated with Allen in the AIU and the Industrial League was Les Boyne, an early member (1904–1906) of the SPGB.

Around December 1908 he moved to Honley in the Colne Valley, where he was resident until 1912. Here he became a supporter of Victor Grayson. He spoke in Chicago with Malatesta in October 1908 and with Rudolf Rocker at the Charlotte Street Club in London the following month. In 1910 he was expelled from the Industrialist League because of his association with Grayson. In August 1912 he moved to London to become assistant secretary of Tom Mann’s Industrial Syndicalist Education League and contributed to their journal The Syndicalist. Also in the ISEL at this time was fellow SPGB founder member George Hicks.

In February 1913 he emigrated to New Zealand, where he became Assistant Editor (later Editor) of the Maoriland Worker. He lost this position shortly after the outbreak of the First World War because he supported the war and conscription and was expelled from the movement. By 1919 he was writing again for the Maoriland Worker. During the interwar years he was a supporter of the New Zealand Labour Party, writing the pamphlet Labour and Politics in 1922, as well as speaking for the New Zealand Rationalist Association and writing many articles for their journal, the New Zealand Rationalist. During this period he assisted John A. Lee, President of the Labour Party, in his attempt to enter parliament.

Despite his degree Allen did not have a professional career, working in the 1920s variously as an unskilled labourer, clerk and driver. He died in Auckland on 16 June 1945.
