= Albert E. Jacomb =

British printer and founding member of the Socialist Party of Great Britain

A. E. Jacomb
- Born: c. 1873
- Died: 1946
- Occupation: printer

Albert E. Jacomb (c. 1873–1946) was a British printer and founding member of the Socialist Party of Great Britain.

Originally with his brother Josiah, Jacomb ran a printing shop in Stratford where he produced much early SPGB literature, including the Socialist Standard from 1904 to 1914, as well as work for trade unions.

In 1906 the Jacomb brothers were involved in a scandal regarding the book Womanhood which they printed and sold. Although this book probably dealt with contraception and the like, it was deemed obscene by the authorities. The brothers were arrested and charged with selling indecent literature.

Jacomb wrote two Socialist Party pamphlets, Socialism (1920) and The Socialist Party: Its Principles and Policies (1934), and was a prolific writer for the Socialist Standard. He was an executive committee member from 1909 to 1919 and was also on the Editorial Committee. At a local level he was branch secretary for East London in 1905 and East Ham in 1906.

Towards the end of the 1930s he came into conflict with the Party, primarily over the Spanish Civil War. Essentially Jacomb thought the Party should support the Republican side in a ‘war for democracy’. During the Second World War his differences became stronger, and in a letter of 25 April 1942 he stated that he intended to publicly attack the SPGB as “a hindrance to the revolution”. This was too much and on 30 June he was charged with action detrimental to the interests of the Party. The results of the party poll on his expulsion (207 votes in favour, 1 against) were announced on 15 December 1942. Subsequently, he produced two pamphlets, AE Jacomb’s case against the Socialist Party and Jacomb Again.

He died in 1946 aged 73.
