= Laurie Weidberg =

British writer

Laurie E. Weidberg (died 1986) was a socialist writer and speaker based in Manchester and London.

== Early life ==
Weidberg was raised in Manchester in petty-bourgeois Jewish family with strict religious ideas. In the 1930s, at the age of seventeen, he developed an interest in leftist politics. He attended a meeting of Stafford Cripps's Labour Party splinter group, but quickly became disillusioned with the speakers (including a young Barbara Castle) whom he judged to be motivated more by self-interest than genuine concern for the betterment of society.

== Career ==
After about a year of perusing literature from various left-wing groups, he stumbled upon the Socialist Party of Great Britain's journal, The Socialist Standard, and was instantly convinced. Soon after, he joined the SPGB, and served as a regular writer for the Standard and as an outdoor speaker at Speakers' Corner and Lincoln's Inn.

Weidberg had a reputation for being caustic, sharp-witted, and provocative, and he harboured a particular hatred for The Guardian. Besides dismissing the newspaper's overall tone as "half-baked lefty crap", he led an eleven-year campaign to challenge its report that snow had fallen during a Lord's cricket match on 2 June 1975. The complaint made it all the way to the Press Council, which eventually ruled in favour of the newspaper. This was not the first time Weidberg had made the news in connection with a complaint about Lord's: at a match earlier in the 1970s, he removed his shirt to enjoy the sunshine, and refused a steward's order to put it back on. He complained to the Marylebone Cricket Club, which ruled that Weidberg was free to go topless so long as he remained motionless.

== Death ==
Laurie Weidberg died in 1986 after a long illness.
