= Harry Young (socialist) =

British socialist activist

Harry Young (28 February 1901 – 1995) was a British socialist activist.

Born in Stoke Newington, Young attended a socialist Sunday school in Islington. He worked in a large number of jobs and, at various times, joined the Herald League, the British Socialist Party (BSP), and the Industrial Workers of the World, while still a teenager. Inspired by the October Revolution, he joined the Communist Party of Great Britain soon after its foundation, in 1920. He was soon appointed as national organiser of its associated Young Communist League (YCL), and in 1921 became the youngest member of the party's executive committee. The following year, he was appointed as the YCL's representative in Moscow, attending the Fourth Congress of the Comintern. On returning to the UK, he served as editor of the English language edition of Communist International, and then as manager of the Collets Bookshop on Charing Cross Road.

In 1937, Young resigned from the CPGB, unhappy that he felt it would uncritically follow all Soviet policies, and became a taxi driver. In 1940, he instead joined the Socialist Party of Great Britain (SPGB). He was a conscientious objector during World War II, serving instead as an ambulance driver in London.

After the war, Young became a regular speaker at Speakers' Corner, and he wrote a column for the Socialist Standard under the pen name of "Horatio". He stood for the party in East Ham South at the 1950 general election, taking 0.7% of the vote. He retrained as a science teacher, becoming active in the National Association of Schoolmasters.

Young remained active in the SPGB in his retirement, serving on its executive committee for several years. In 1991, he was part of the Socialist Studies split. In 1994, he obtained a degree in science from the Open University, becoming its oldest graduate that year. He died the following year.
