= Julian Lewis =

British Conservative politician (born 1951)

The Right Honourable Sir Julian Lewis MP
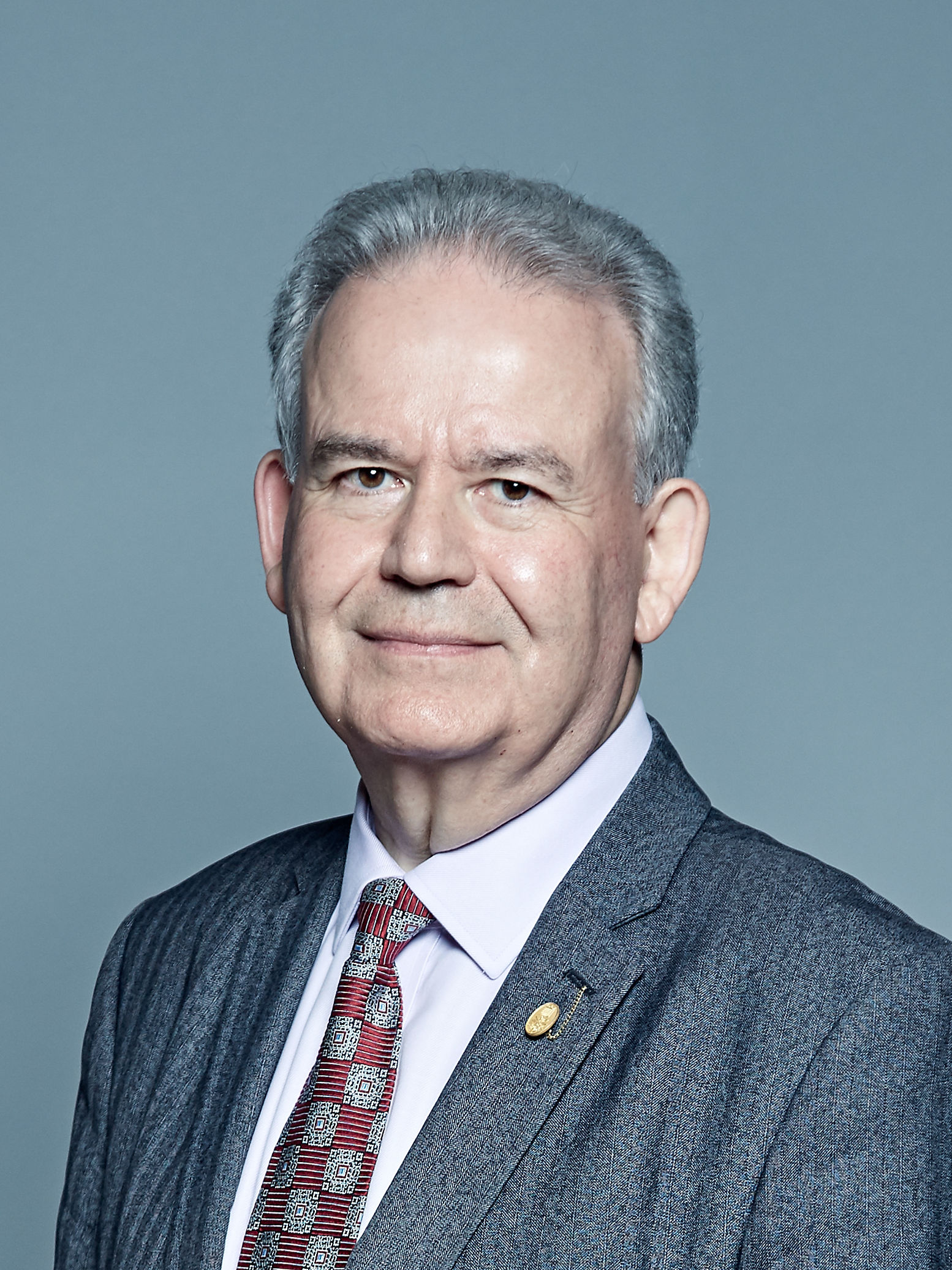
- Official portrait, 2018

Chair of the Intelligence and Security Committee
- In office 15 July 2020 – 30 May 2024
- Preceded by: Dominic Grieve
- Succeeded by: Kevan Jones

Chair of the Defence Select Committee
- In office 17 June 2015 – 6 November 2019
- Preceded by: Rory Stewart
- Succeeded by: Tobias Ellwood

Shadow Minister for the Armed Forces
- In office 10 May 2005 – 6 May 2010
- Leader: David Cameron

Shadow Minister for the Cabinet Office
- In office 1 July 2004 – 10 May 2005
- Leader: Michael Howard

Shadow Minister for the Armed Forces
- In office 1 July 2002 – 1 July 2004
- Leader: Iain Duncan Smith

Opposition Whip
- In office 18 September 2001 – 1 July 2002
- Leader: Iain Duncan Smith

Member of Parliament for New Forest East
- Incumbent
- Assumed office 1 May 1997
- Preceded by: Constituency created
- Majority: 8,495 (18.8%)

Personal details
- Born: Julian Murray Lewis; 26 September 1951 (age 75) Swansea, Wales
- Party: Conservative (Note: Whip suspended from 15 July 2020 to 30 December 2020)
- Other political affiliations: Labour (1976–1978; entryist)
- Education: Balliol College, Oxford (MA); St Antony's College, Oxford (DPhil)
- Awards: Knight Bachelor

Military service
- Allegiance: United Kingdom
- Branch/service: Royal Naval Reserve
- Years of service: 1979–1982
- Rank: Seaman
- Unit: HMS President – 10th Mine Counter-Measures Squadron

Academic background
- Thesis: British military planning for post-war strategic defence, 1942–47 (1981)

Sir Julian Murray Lewis (born 26 September 1951) is a British Conservative Party politician who has been the Member of Parliament (MP) for New Forest East since 1997. Lewis served as Chair of the Intelligence and Security Committee (ISC) from 2020 until the 2024 General Election, having previously been Chair of the Defence Select Committee (HCDC), from 2015 to 2017 and from 2017 to 2019. He is the first Parliamentarian to have chaired both the ISC and the HCDC.

Lewis actively pursues the retention and renewal of the British strategic nuclear deterrent, the UK Trident programme which was confirmed in 2016. Since then, his principal focus has been on restoring UK Defence expenditure to 3% of GDP.

Lewis had the Conservative Party whip removed after successfully standing against Boris Johnson's preferred candidate for the chairmanship of the Intelligence and Security Committee, former Secretary of State for Transport Chris Grayling, on 15 July 2020. The whip was restored on 30 December 2020.

A Eurosceptic, Lewis is a supporter of the pro-Brexit groups Leave Means Leave and the European Research Group (ERG). He was one of just 28 Conservative MPs (the 'Spartans') who voted all three times against Theresa May's EU Withdrawal Agreement, regarding it as "Brexit in Name Only".

== Early life and career ==
Julian Lewis was born on 26 September 1951 in Swansea, into a Jewish family, the son of a tailor and designer. He went to Dynevor Grammar School, competing in the school team for Television Top of the Form, broadcast on BBC1 on Thursday 2 June 1966, losing to Fairfield Grammar School, of Bristol, in the semi-finals. The school would also enter the radio competition the following year; to get to the semi-final, his team had beaten Malvern College (girls) on 19 May in the fourth heat.

He went to Balliol College, Oxford, receiving a BA, later promoted to MA, in Philosophy and Politics. He studied as a postgraduate at St Antony's College, Oxford, being awarded the DPhil in Strategic Studies for his thesis on "British Military Planning for Post War Strategic Defence, 1942-1947" in 1981.

From 1976 until early 1978, with secret funding from The Freedom Association, he posed as a Labour Party moderate and briefly won control of Newham North East Constituency Labour Party, in an eventually unsuccessful attempt to reverse the deselection of the sitting MP, Reg Prentice, and in order to highlight Militant tendency entryism in the Labour Party. Prentice himself later joined the Conservatives.

At the end of the Newham campaign, in 1978, Lewis returned to his studies at Oxford and joined the London Division of the Royal Naval Reserve, at HMS President, serving as a Seaman on the Southampton-based Ton-class minesweeper, HMS Glasserton (M1141).

Lewis became a leading opponent of the Campaign for Nuclear Disarmament, and other Left-wing organisations, throughout the 1980s. From 1981 to 1985, he was Research Director and then a Director of the Coalition for Peace through Security, set up to support the replacement of Polaris by Trident and the deployment of NATO cruise missiles at RAF Greenham Common and RAF Molesworth, to counter the Soviet SS-20 missiles. This helped the achievement of President Reagan's 1981 Zero Option proposal in the form of the 1987 Intermediate-Range Nuclear Forces Treaty.

From the mid-1980s, Lewis was also Director of Policy Research Associates, working with Conservative and Crossbench members of the House of Lords to initiate changes to legislation (1) requiring postal ballots for trade union elections (incorporated in the Trade Union Act 1984 and Employment Act 1988); (2) outlawing political indoctrination in schools (incorporated in the Education Act 1986 and carried forward in the Education Act 1996); (3) prohibiting local councils from publishing material which "promotes or opposes a point of view on a question of political controversy which is identifiable as the view of one political party and not of another" (incorporated in section 27 of the Local Government Act 1988); and (4) more strictly defining the concept of 'due impartiality' in the coverage of politically contentious issues on television and radio (incorporated in the Broadcasting Act 1990).

From 1990 until 1996, Lewis was a Deputy Director of the Conservative Research Department (CRD) at Conservative Central Office (CCO). In the run-up to the 1992 General Election, CCO published detailed directories, compiled by Lewis, listing Labour MPs' and candidates' support for left-wing causes. He continued in his CRD role after his selection in February 1996 as prospective Parliamentary candidate for the new constituency of New Forest East, but in December that year he resigned from CCO to campaign against the UK joining the single European currency. Only later did opposition to adopting the Euro become official Conservative policy.

In a lecture to former Dynevor School pupils in May 2017, Lewis set out details of his background, his path into politics and his overall conclusions about Parliamentary life.

== Parliamentary career ==
Lewis stood as the Conservative candidate in Swansea West at the 1983 general election, coming second with 36.6% of the vote behind the incumbent Labour MP Alan Williams.

At the 1997 general election, Lewis was elected to Parliament as MP for New Forest East with 42.9% of the vote and a majority of 5,215.

In August 2000, Lewis attacked Conservative defectors to Labour due to the party supporting Section 28, describing the "gay lobby" as supporting "propaganda promoting homosexuality" at the expense of taxpayers.

Lewis was re-elected as MP for New Forest East at the 2001 general election with a decreased vote share of 42.4% and a decreased majority of 3,829. He was again re-elected at the 2005 general election, with an increased vote share of 48.6% and an increased majority of 6,551.

Following an article inThe Sunday Telegraph its website alleged in May 2009 that he had "attempted to claim £6,000 in expenses for a wooden floor at his second home". He maintained that: "At no stage did I claim for the flooring and it did not cost the taxpayer a penny." Lewis reported The Telegraph to the Press Complaints Commission following which, in December 2009, the newspaper published what it described as a "clarification", stating that he had "asked the Fees Office whether he could make such a claim and was told it would be 'extravagant'. He accepted that advice and no claim was made". The Commission ruled that this was sufficient remedy.

At the 2010 general election, Lewis was again re-elected with an increased vote share of 52.8% and an increased majority of 11,307.

With the creation of the Liberal-Conservative Coalition as a result of the election of a hung parliament in 2010, the post which he had shadowed (Minister for the Armed Forces) was allocated to the Liberal Democrat Defence spokesman, Nick Harvey MP. Lewis was appointed as a member of Parliament's Intelligence and Security Committee in September 2010. He has also been a vice-chairman of the Conservative Friends of Poland.

Lewis has been described by The Daily Telegraph as "one of the most vigorous rightwingers in the Commons" and by The Guardian as the Conservative Party's "front bench terrier". He was one of the Frontbenchers and Backbenchers of the Year chosen by commentators on the ConservativeHome website, in December 2009 and December 2010 respectively.

In February 2011, he strongly opposed, and was one of three Conservative MPs who voted against, Coalition plans to transfer heritage forests from public ownership to trusts. The plans were later disowned by the Government and abandoned.

In October 2011, he was one of 81 Conservative rebels who voted in favour of a referendum on the UK's membership of the European Union and, in October 2012, he was one of 53 Conservative rebels voting to demand a real-terms cut in the EU budget. Both policies were later adopted by the party leadership.

In May 2014, he was one of eight candidates for the chairmanship of the House of Commons Defence Select Committee, coming second with 212 votes to the eventual winner's 226.

At the 2015 general election, Lewis was again re-elected with an increased vote share of 56.3% and an increased majority of 19,162.

On 17 June 2015, he was elected to chair the Defence Select Committee in a three-way contest with Richard Benyon and Colonel Bob Stewart.

In November and December 2015, before and during the debate on bombing ISIL/Daesh in Syria, Lewis challenged David Cameron's claim that there were 70,000 "moderate" Syrian fighters opposing ISIL/Daesh, describing the figure as "magical" and quoting expert commentators' views that the "Free Syrian Army" contained many Islamists. In the Commons debate on 2 December, Lewis stated that "instead of having dodgy dossiers [as in the 2003 Iraq conflict], we now have bogus battalions of moderate fighters". He predicted that "Once Daesh has been driven out... an Occupying Power will have to remain in control for many years to come... and only the Syrian Government Army is likely to provide it... Airstrikes alone are a dangerous diversion and distraction. What is needed is a grand military alliance involving not only the West but Russia and, yes, its Syrian Government clients too.... We need to choose the lesser of two evils and abandon the fiction of a cosy third choice" between "very nasty authoritarians and Islamist totalitarians". After making this widely reported speech, Lewis voted against extending airstrikes against ISIL/Daesh into Syria in the absence of "credible ground forces", and he continued to maintain that, apart from the Kurdish-led forces, in Syria the choice remained "between monsters on the one hand, and maniacs on the other".

Lewis was again re-elected at the snap 2017 general election with an increased vote share of 62.6% and an increased majority of 21,995.

On 12 July 2017, he was again elected to chair the Defence Select Committee, by 305 votes to 265 votes, in a direct contest with Johnny Mercer.

He was again re-elected at the 2019 general election with an increased vote share of 64.5% and an increased majority of 25,251. Lewis was again re-elected at the 2024 general election, with a decreased vote share of 38.5% and a decreased majority of 8,495.

=== Accessibility ===
Lewis is the only MP who does not allow his constituents to contact him by email. In a letter in The Guardian he stated: "Letters, phone calls, and, where appropriate, surgery appointments are perfectly adequate for people who genuinely need my help, as the many letters of thanks quoted on my website fully confirm. Only mass, manipulative campaigners and obsessive individuals find this a problem – and so they should!"

=== Intelligence and Security Committee ===
On 15 July 2020, Lewis was elected Chair of the Intelligence and Security Committee of Parliament (ISC) with the support of the opposition MPs on the committee. He defeated Chris Grayling, who had been Boris Johnson's preferred candidate. Lewis had the Conservative Party whip removed later that day for what a government source described as "working with Labour and other opposition MPs for his own advantage"; but Lewis stated that he had never responded to government whips about how he would vote, because he considered it an "improper request" as the 2013 Justice and Security Act explicitly removed the Prime Minister's right to choose the committee chair: "At no earlier stage did I give any undertaking to vote for any particular candidate". Although, the following day, the Leader of the House, Jacob Rees-Mogg, said he would not rule out a plot to remove Lewis from the ISC, the government took no further action against him and restored the Conservative Party whip to him unconditionally on 30 December 2020.

== Military writings and honorary academic posts ==
His essay on Nuclear Disarmament versus Peace in the 21st Century won the Trench Gascoigne Prize of the Royal United Services Institute for Defence and Security Studies (RUSI) in 2005. Two years later, Lewis won this prize for a second time, with an essay entitled Double-I, Double-N: A Framework for Counter-Insurgency.

His 10,000-word dissertation on The Future of the British Nuclear Deterrent was selected for an award and for publication as a Seaford House Paper by the Royal College of Defence Studies of which he was a Parliamentary member in 2006.

Lewis's own most recent book, published in 2011, is a military biography Racing Ace – The Fights and Flights of "Kink" Kinkead DSO DSC* DFC*, published in 2011, recounting the adventurous life of a pioneering airman whose grave he found in his constituency. In choosing it as a 'Book of the Year 2011' for The Sunday Telegraph Magazine, historian Andrew Roberts described Samuel Kinkead as "one of the bravest airmen of the 20th century", and Racing Ace as "exactly what an action biography should be".

Lewis's critique of strategy in Afghanistan International Terrorism – The Case for Containment was published in the US military journal Joint Force Quarterly in April 2012.

In 2010, Lewis was appointed as a Visiting Senior Research Fellow, Centre for Defence Studies, Department of War Studies, King's College, London; and, in 2019, he became an Honorary Professor, Strategy and Security Institute, University of Exeter.

== Honours ==
Lewis was appointed to the Privy Council of the United Kingdom in March 2015 and therefore granted the style The Right Honourable. He was knighted in the 2023 New Year Honours for political and public service.

Parliament of the United Kingdom
New constituency	Member of Parliament for New Forest East; 1997–present	Incumbent
