= Tom Kemp =

Tom Kemp (1921–1993) was a prominent Marxist economic historian and political theorist. He was influential in socialist and Trotskyist parties in the UK, and published several influential books on Marxist theory and economic development, in particular Theories of Imperialism which made an important contribution to assimilating globalisation into Marxist theory.

== Early life ==
Kemp was born in Wandsworth, London, to a working-class family. He gained a scholarship to the grammar school Emanuel School and during his school years Kemp became involved with the Young Communist League (UK) and Communist Party of Great Britain. He was thrown out of the school Cadet Force for distributing communist literature about the Spanish Civil War.

In 1939 he enrolled at the London School of Economics, breaking his studies after a year to serve in the Royal Navy as a rating in landing craft, participating on his 21st birthday in the Bruneval Raid and subsequently the Dieppe Raid. Towards the end of the war Kemp was stationed in liberated Marseille and met the Frenchwoman whom he married after the war. Kemp was a lifelong Francophile and wrote important texts on French economic history and the history of Stalinism in France.

Kemp returned to his studies at LSE in 1946 and in 1950 joined the economics faculty of the University of Hull, where he taught for over 30 years.

== Academic work ==
Kemp wrote a number of works on Marxist theory and economic development, in particular Theories of Imperialism which made an important contribution to assimilating globalisation into Marxist theory. His works on economic development are also important. He was prolific contributor to Marxist journals including the Labour Review and the International Socialist Review, and in 1968 was the opponent in that year's Socialist Party of Great Britain debates. Kemp also wrote contributions for the Encyclopædia Britannica.

In the 1970s, University of Hull was one of the leading centers for economic history, fuelled in-part by the intellectual division between John Saville and the New Left and Kemp on the Trotskyist left.

He was the doctoral advisor of Gabriel Salazar, who had arrived to the University of Hull as an exile from the military dictatorship in Chile.

== Political activity ==
As a political activist Kemp was, together with Cliff Slaughter, one of the theoreticians behind the Socialist Labour League and the Workers Revolutionary Party.

Like many others, Kemp left the Communist Party of Great Britain in 1956 at the time of the Soviet Invasion of Hungary. In 1957 he joined The Club (Trotskyist), the Trotskyist group within the Labour Party led by Gerry Healy. Kemp was an important thinker and activist within the group and its successor organisations the Socialist Labour League and the Workers Revolutionary Party.

In 1967 Kemp took a stand against the party's cataclysmic projections of the imminent economic end of the capitalist system, submitting an alternate document on economic perspectives to the party conference and refusing to back down. Only he voted for the document, and he was nearly driven from the party.

However, he regained influence and continued to be an important thinker in the party until 1980 when, according to Cyril Smith, disillusionment with Healy’s leadership led him to withdraw from party activities. After Healy’s expulsion from the party in 1985 Kemp resumed an active role in WRP, continuing until his death in 1993.

Kemp also played a central role in the theoretical work of the International Committee of the Fourth International, and co-edited the Fourth International Journal.

== Selected works ==
- Theories of Imperialism (Dobson, 1967)
- Industrialization in Nineteenth Century Europe (Longman 1969)
- Economic Forces in French History: Essay on the Development of the French Economy, 1760-1914 (Dobson, 1971)
- French Economy, 1913-39 (Longman, 1972)
- Historical Patterns of Industrialization (Longman, 1978)
- Karl Marx's "Capital" Today (New Park Publications 1982)
- Industrialization in the Non-Western World (Longman, 1983)
- Stalinism in France: The First Twenty Years of the French Communist Party (New Park Publications 1984)
- The Climax of Capitalism: The US Economy in the Twentieth Century (Longman 1990)
