= Coalition for Peace through Security =

The Coalition for Peace Through Security (CPS) was a campaigning group founded in September 1981 and active in the UK throughout the early and mid-1980s. It strongly opposed unilateral nuclear disarmament and withdrawal from NATO as advocated by the Campaign for Nuclear Disarmament, supporting instead the replacement of Polaris by Trident and the deployment of NATO cruise missiles after the Soviet Union began deploying its SS20 missiles in 1977. The basis of the CPS case was set out in detail in a book published towards the end of the campaign, Paul Mercer's "Peace" of the Dead, and many of its arguments at the time can still be found on the website of Julian Lewis, formerly its Research Director.

Its main activists were Julian Lewis, Edward Leigh, Tony Kerpel and, for its first year only, Francis Holihan. It was said to have close relations with the Institute for the Study of Conflict, the Institute of Economic Affairs and the Centre for Policy Studies.

The CPS was said to have close links with Conservative leaders. It was endorsed by British Prime Minister Margaret Thatcher and rented its offices in Whitehall, London, from Jeffrey Archer. It was associated with the Campaign For Defence and Multilateral Disarmament (CDMD), which was run by Conservative Central Office. The CDMD included Winston Churchill, Conservative Party Chairman John Selwyn Gummer, Minister of State for Defence Peter Blaker, MOD spokesman Ray Whitney, Secretary of State for Defence Michael Heseltine and Conservative ex-Chairman Cecil Parkinson. The Economist newspaper reported in 1983 that the CPS had had meetings with Blaker. The Guardian newspaper reported that Churchill was appointed by Thatcher to co-ordinate the Government's campaign against CND. Parkinson was also involved with the CPS, and, according to Dorril he passed them a list of Conservative Party agents. The CPMD was said to have distributed CPS literature.

Amongst its activities were commissioning a series of Gallup polls showing levels of support for and opposition to British possession of nuclear weapons; providing speakers at public meetings and debates; highlighting what it considered to be the left-wing affiliations of leading CND figures; and mounting counter-demonstrations and stunts to undermine those organised by CND - for example, haranguing CND marchers from the roof of its offices and chartering a plane to fly over a CND festival with a banner reading, "Help the Soviets, Support CND!" The CPS also drew attention to peace movement links with other bodies, such as the World Peace Council (WPC), the World Federation of Scientific Workers (WFSW) and the Soviet Peace Committee (SPC), which were funded and controlled by the Soviet Union.

The CPS attracted criticism for not revealing its sources of funding while alleging that parts of the anti-nuclear movement were funded by the Soviet Union. The CPS was not a membership organisation and was financed by The 61, "a private sector operational intelligence agency" said by its founder, Brian Crozier, to be funded by "rich individuals and a few private companies". The CPS was said to have also received funding from The Heritage Foundation in 1982.

Bruce Kent, CND's general secretary, said in his autobiography that Francis Holihan spied on CND. It was said that Holihan sent senior clerics in the Catholic Church material about Kent, that he organised the aerial propaganda against CND, that he entered CND offices under false pretences and that CPS workers joined CND in order to gain access to the Campaign's 1982 Annual Conference. A draft CPS leaflet, but not its printed version, also linked Bruce Kent, then General Secretary of CND, to IRA hunger-strikers. When Kent went on a speaking tour of America, Holihan was said to have followed him, critical material on Kent was sent to newspapers and radio stations and demonstrations were organised against him. The CPS and Holihan parted company before the end of 1982.

With the decline in anti-nuclear agitation from 1985, and the Zero Option agreement in the 1987 INF Treaty to scrap both cruise and SS20 missiles, the organisers of the CPS pursued other political objectives. Tony Kerpel MBE became Chief of Staff to Conservative Party Chairman Kenneth Baker. Edward Leigh and Julian Lewis became Conservative MPs, for Gainsborough and New Forest East respectively.

Though unconnected with them, the CPS may have inspired the emergence of similar overseas organisations like the New Zealand–based Peace Through Security, which was formed by conservative activist Dr Thomas Jim Sprott to oppose the Fourth Labour Government's anti-nuclear policy. Like the CPS, the New Zealand Peace through Security alleged that the local anti-nuclear movement had been infiltrated and manipulated by pro-Soviet Communist elements.
