= Jack Kent (politician) =

British politician

Jack Kent (1870 in Lambeth, London – 1946) was a British politician and an important figure in the early history of the Socialist Party of Great Britain.

Kent was a well-known member of the Social Democratic Federation, being a writer for Justice from 1897 and a speaker and lecture secretary. In 1902 he was on the SDF Executive Committee and was delegate for West Ham Central during the 1902 SDF Conference. He was not originally an impossibilist but came over after the 24 April meeting, revealing the manoeuvrings of Hyndman clique.

Kent was working as a clerk at Whitbreads brewery when he helped found the Socialist Party of Great Britain in June 1904. He was variously an indoor and outdoor speaker, a writer for the Socialist Standard, Party delegate to the Amsterdam Congress of the Second International in August 1904, secretary of Romford Division branch in 1904–1905, an Executive Committee member in 1905–1906 and finally Treasurer in 1907–1908. Kent resigned on 30 March 1908, probably as he did not want politics to prejudice his career advancement.

After leaving the SPGB he helped organise the ‘Constitutionalists’, a popular anti-socialist organisation, later joining the Conservative Party. He became a local councillor in 1912, going on to become mayor of Acton in 1922–1923 and a Middlesex county councillor. He died in 1946.
