= Con Lehane (socialist) =

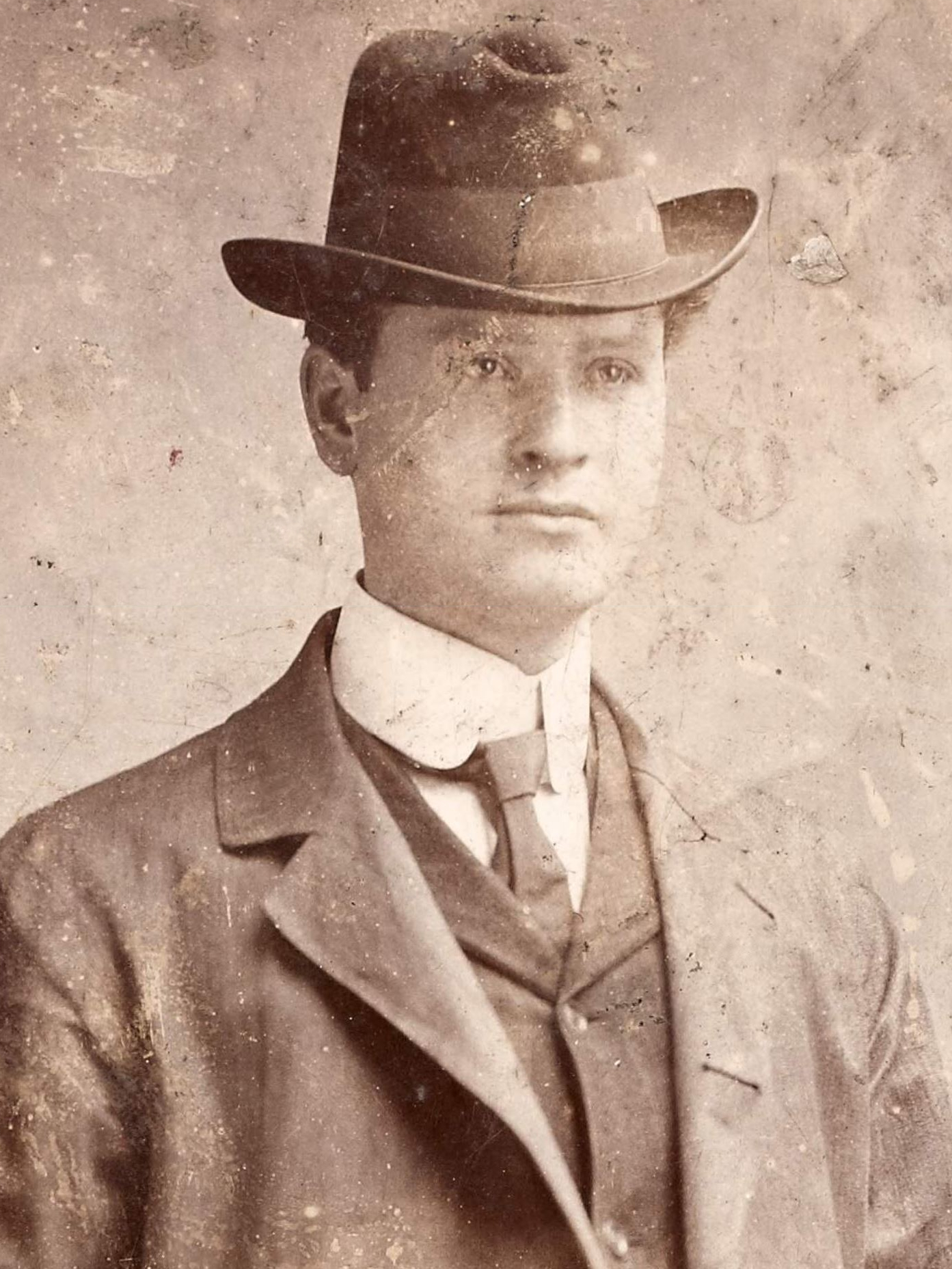
- Lehane, c. 1905
- Born: 1877; Coachford, County Cork
- Died: 31 December 1919; New York City
- Occupation: Clerk
- Political party: Socialist Party of Great Britain (1904-1906)
- Movement: World Socialist Movement

Cornelius "Con" Lehane (also spelled O'Lyhane) (1877–31 December 1919) was a socialist active in the Irish Socialist Republican Party, the Social Democratic Federation, and the Socialist Party of Great Britain.

== Ireland ==
Lehane was born in Coachford, County Cork in 1877. Although a graduate in Irish and chemistry from Cork Technical School, by profession Lehane was a clerk (cf. E. J. B. Allen).

Like Valentine McEntee, Lehane had been a member of James Connolly's Irish Socialist Republican Party and indeed was one of the dozen or so most important members.

As "Proletarian", he wrote many articles for the ISRP journal, The Workers Republic, and designed the front cover for the ISRP's Workers’ Republic pamphlet series. (He may well have designed the cover of the SPGB's first pamphlet, which is carried out in a similar fashion). O'Lyhane, as he was then known, was the moving force behind the Cork branch (1897–1902).

== Britain ==
He then moved to England, joining the Social Democratic Federation around the turn of the century.

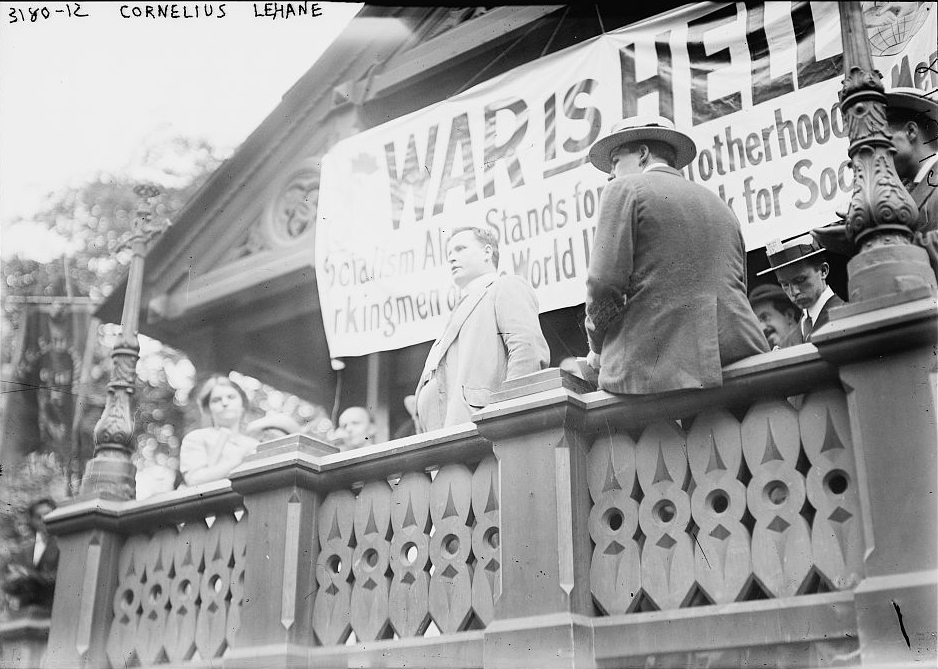
Cornelius Lehane at "the cottage" in Union Square, New York City speaking during a Socialist anti-war rally against World War I. The sign reads "War is hell, Socialism alone stands for brotherhood, Working men of the world will work for Socialism."

Lehane eventually left the SDF and was a founding member of the Socialist Party of Great Britain in 1904. He was the first General Secretary of the SPGB (June 1904 to August 1905) and was a prominent public speaker for the Party. He was expelled along with most of the rest of Islington branch on 18 September 1906.

His downfall came as follows. At the 1906 Annual Conference Bexley branch tabled a motion calling on the party to adopt a policy of socialist industrial unionism. This was voted down and charges brought against the branch. They were eventually expelled but Islington branch, led by Lehane, argued that the question should never have arisen and demanded that the Executive Committee should be removed for not rescinding the Bexley resolution and refusing to alter the record of the resolution.

Islington ceased activity when this did not happen. Charges were hence brought against the branch. After being expelled the group continued to meet for a while as Islington branch of the SPGB and published two pamphlets (Rocks Ahead and Another Political Wreck) both signed by Lehane and his branch. Some time after leaving the SPGB he emigrated to the U.S., where in 1913 he cooperated with Jim Larkin. The SPGB noted his presence there in 1915.

In 1917, he was jailed for his opposition to the war. He died on 31 December 1919 in a New York City hospital shortly after being released from prison.
