= Adam Buick =

British politician

Adam Lewis Buick (born 6 January 1944) is a prominent London-based socialist.

Buick was born in Newport, Monmouthshire, Wales and graduated from the University of Oxford. He joined the Socialist Party of Great Britain in 1962 and since then has been one of its most active members. He is a frequent public speaker for the Party, and as of 2007 is the all-time second-most prolific contributor to the Socialist Standard. Buick served as the Party's General Secretary from 1993 to 1995.

Buick's writings on socialist theory have been widely referenced and critiqued in the leftist press and in scholarly journals.

== Selected bibliography ==
- Jerome, W. and Adam Buick. "Soviet State Capitalism? The History of an Idea". Survey: A Journal of Soviet and East European Studies, No. 62, January 1967, pp. 58–71.
- Buick, Adam. "Proletarian Self-emancipation". Radical Philosophy No. 7, Spring 1974.
- Buick, Adam. "Joseph Dietzgen". Radical Philosophy No. 10, Spring 1975.
- Buick, Adam. "The Irish Question: A Socialist Analysis". Wereldsocialisme 1976.
- Pannekoek, Anton. "The theory of the collapse of capitalism". Transl. Adam Buick. Capital and Class No. 1, Spring 1977.
- Buick, Adam. "Bordigism". In Rubel, Maximilien and John Crump, eds., Non-market Socialism in the Nineteenth and Twentieth Centuries. Houndmills, Basingstoke, Hampshire: Macmillan, 1987. ISBN 0-333-41300-8 (cased); ISBN 0-333-41301-6 (paperback).
- Buick, Adam and John Crump. State Capitalism: The Wages System Under New Management. Houndmills, Basingstoke, Hampshire : Macmillan, 1986. ISBN 0-333-36775-8 (hardcover); ISBN 0-333-36776-6 (paperback).
- Buick, Adam in Coleman, Stephen William Morris and News from Nowhere: A Vision for Our Time. Green Books, August 1991. ISBN 978-1870098373.
- Sarkar, Binay & Buick, Adam (2009). Marxian Economics and Globalization. Avenel Press. ISBN 978-81-902529-5-9.
- Sarkar, Binay & Buick, Adam (2012). MARXISM, LENINISM – POLES APART. Avenel Press. ISBN 978-93-80761-20-6.
- Buick, Adam in Nelson, Anitra Life Without Money: Building Fair and Sustainable Economies. Pluto Press, 2011. ISBN 0745331653 .
