= T. A. Jackson (communist) =

British communist activist (1879–1955)

Thomas A. Jackson
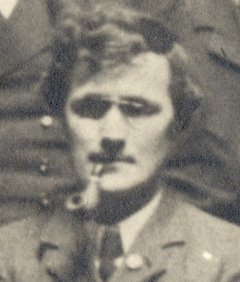
- Tommy Jackson at the 1905 SPGB Conference
- Born: Thomas Alfred Jackson; 21 August 1879; Clerkenwell, London, England
- Died: 18 August 1955 (aged 75); Clare, Suffolk, England
- Other name: Tommy
- Citizenship: United Kingdom
- Known for: Founding member of the Socialist Party of Great Britain. Founding member of the Communist Party of Great Britain; Secretary for the League of Militant Atheists.
- Notable work: Dialectics: The Logic of Marxism and its Critics (1936)

Thomas Alfred Jackson (21 August 1879 – 18 August 1955), known as T. A. Jackson or Tommy Jackson, was a founding member of the Socialist Party of Great Britain and the Communist Party of Great Britain. He was a communist activist and newspaper editor, and worked variously as a party functionary, freelance lecturer, and writer. Historian Jonathan Rose described him as "the most brilliant proletarian intellectual to come out of the British Communist Party."

== Biography ==
=== Early years ===
Jackson was born in Clerkenwell, London, on 21 August 1879. His father, Thomas Blackwell Jackson, was a compositor and a firm Gladstonian liberal and trade unionist with Fenian sympathies. An avid reader from a young age, Jackson was limited in his formal education to attending Duncombe Road School in Upper Holloway, a board school at which he was a pupil between the ages of seven and thirteen and a half. After leaving school, he was apprenticed in the printing trade as a compositor, but eventually abandoned the trade to become a full-time political speaker, and later a writer.

=== Political career ===
Jackson dated his conversion to socialism to 1900, after he read a copy of Robert Blatchford's book Merrie England which had been given to him years earlier by an older colleague at the printworks where he apprenticed. That year he joined the Social Democratic Federation (SDF), where he developed his oratorical skills at open-air meetings, overcoming the shyness he had endured as a child. Whilst a member of the SDF, he attended classes on Marx's Capital which were taught by Jack Fitzgerald, whom Jackson described as "very nearly the best-read man I have ever met".

In 1904, Jackson helped found the Socialist Party of Great Britain (SPGB). He was an early member of the Executive Committee and toured the country over the next few years as a Party spokesman. He also contributed a small number of opinion pieces to the Socialist Standard. He resigned from the SPGB in March 1909 to become a paid speaker for the Independent Labour Party (ILP) in Bristol and South Wales, initially spending three months in Bristol before moving to Newport, where he stayed until the summer of 1911.

He left the ILP in 1911. Next, he was a speaker for the National Secular Society (NSS) in Leeds and finally a freelance lecturer, after complaints were filed against him for discussing his atheism while speaking for the ILP and for promoting his socialist beliefs while speaking for the NSS. During the First World War he was arrested and charged under the Defence of the Realm Act 1914 after telling a local Conservative leader that Leeds workers would dispose of the "imitation Kaisers" of the city once they had done the same to the German Kaiser: however, the case was eventually dismissed by the magistrate. Jackson subsequently found employment as a storekeeper and in 1917 he joined the Socialist Labour Party, becoming a lecturer for the North East Labour College Committee in 1919, travelling the villages of the Great Northern Coalfield to teach classes on Marxism.

In 1920, Jackson was a founding member of the Communist Party of Great Britain (CPGB), although he was not present at the party's initial congress. In the early 1920s, he paid visits to Dublin, where he met Constance Markievicz, Charlotte Despard and Maud Gonne, and to Moscow, where he was introduced to Joseph Stalin, Sen Katayama and Clara Zetkin; a planned meeting with Vladimir Lenin was cancelled due to the latter's illness.

Jackson played a major role in the CPGB, serving on the Central Committee from 1924 to 1929, and editing The Communist and The Sunday Worker. He was among those arrested before the General Strike of 1926. In 1929 he was removed from Party leadership, essentially for opposing the 'Left turn' of the Third Period (which characterised the Labour Party as ‘social-fascist’), but he remained a paid CPGB journalist who contributed to the Daily Worker and wrote several CPGB pamphlets. In 1933 he was an organiser within the British section of the League of Militant Atheists. In the 1940s, he returned to his roots, working as a lecturer on Communist theory for the Party's Education Department, travelling across the country for eight or nine months of the year.

=== Writings ===
Beginning in the 1920s, Jackson became a prolific writer. He produced book reviews, pamphlets on historical events including the French Revolution and Russian Revolution, and agitational tracts. One of his pamphlets was a critique of the British monarchy, The Jubilee – and How (1935), arguing that the Silver Jubilee of George V was inappropriate at a time of widespread unemployment.

His most substantial work was Dialectics: The Logic of Marxism and its Critics (1936). Largely self-taught in philosophy, Jackson attempted in the book to provide "a staunch defense of the dialectics of nature, and put great stress on the connection between the Marxist conception of understanding (its subjective dialectics) and its conceptions of nature, history, and revolution (its objective dialectics)." The book was also a polemic against various critics of Marxism in the English-speaking world.

Next, he researched the life of Charles Dickens and published Charles Dickens: The Progress of a Radical (1937). Jackson's 1940 book Trials of British Freedom recounted trials-at-law in British history that involved issues of "social emancipation and political sovereignty." As Philip Bounds notes:

Jackson had a voracious hunger for knowledge and wrote groundbreaking and still eminently readable books on history, philosophy, politics and literature. He also made a deep impression on the thousands of people who turned out to hear his lectures and speeches. It seems unlikely that anyone else in Britain did as much to inspire working-class recruits to the Communist Party to immerse themselves in the life of the mind.

In 1946, he published a passionate defense of Irish independence, Ireland—Her Own. His 1953 autobiography, Solo Trumpet, retold the first forty years of his life and has been called "a classic working-class memoir".

=== Personal life ===
Along with his oratorical skill, Jackson was known for his aversion to "excessive cleanliness" (it was allegedly a reaction to his mother's zealous concern with always being "clean and tidy"). He married another founding member of the SPGB, Katherine "Katie" Sarah Hawkins, a socialist and suffragette descended from naval commander (and early slave trader) Sir John Hawkins, as well as a cousin of The Prisoner of Zenda author Anthony Hope. The couple had three daughters: Eleanor, who died in infancy; Stella, who was a writer active in Irish radical politics; and Vivien, who was a teacher at Summerhill School and married Marxist historian A.L. Morton. Katie died in January 1927, having been committed to Claybury Hospital due to declining mental health. Jackson married a second time later that year, to Lydia Packman: she died unexpectedly in 1943 following a minor operation.

=== Death and legacy ===
Tommy Jackson died at Clare, Suffolk on 18 August 1955, just three days shy of his 76th birthday.

The Manchester Guardian obituary labeled him a "Marxist scholar of weight" and characterized Solo Trumpet as "a racy autobiography". Historian Stuart Macintyre described Dialectics: The Logic of Marxism and its Critics as "perhaps...the most considerable literary achievement of Jackson's generation of working-class intellectuals".

== Selected bibliography ==
- A Great Socialist, Frederick Engels. London: N.C.L.C. Publishing Society. 1935. LCCN 2025294736. OCLC 1085360.
- Dialectics: The Logic of Marxism and its Critics. London: Lawrence and Wishart. 1936. LCCN 36029847.
- Charles Dickens: The Progress of a Radical. London: Lawrence and Wishart. 1937. LCCN 37023826.
- Trials of British Freedom. London: Lawrence and Wishart. 1940. LCCN 40014493.
- Ireland—Her Own: An Outline History of the Irish Struggle for National Freedom and Independence. London: Cobbett Press. 1946. OCLC 4111521.
- Old Friends to Keep. London: Lawrence and Wishart. 1950. LCCN 52019519.
- Solo Trumpet: Some Memories of Socialist Agitation and Propaganda. London: Lawrence & Wishart. 1953. OCLC 12308844.

== Sources consulted ==
- Socialist Party of Great Britain 1904–1913 membership register
- Justice, weekly newspaper of the Social Democratic Federation
- Thomas A. Jackson. Solo Trumpet
- "Thomas A. Jackson". Dictionary of Labour Biography, Volume IV
- Vivien Morton and Stuart Macintyre T. A. Jackson: A Centenary Appreciation. "Our History", pamphlet 73, 1979
- Socialist Standard, August 1909

Media offices
Preceded by Raymond Postgate	Editor of The Communist; 1922–1923	Succeeded by Publication closed Rajani Palme Dutt as editor of Workers' Weekly
