= Robert Barltrop =

Robert Barltrop (6 November 1922 – 26 April 2009) was an English socialist activist, essayist, and biographer, as well as being an artist and illustrator.

Barltrop grew up in the East End of London, descended from a long line of blacksmiths, although his great-grandfather had become highly successful as a brickmaker and builder, and was responsible for the building of large numbers of houses in Walthamstow. Robert's father Edwin was a horse fodder dealer; Robert won a scholarship to the Sir George Monoux Grammar School in Walthamstow, now Sir George Monoux College. During World War II, he served with the Royal Air Force, but was invalided out with tuberculosis before seeing active service.

He was for many years a member of the Socialist Party of Great Britain, and edited their magazine The Socialist Standard. His written contributions were prolific, and he also contributed illustrations of his own making. He had various careers, and at different times was a professional boxer, a labourer, a strip cartoonist, a schoolteacher and a sign-painter. Barltrop also published widely and his books include: The Monument: Story of the Socialist Party of Great Britain (1975), Jack London: The Man, the Writer, the Rebel (1977), Muvver Tongue with Jim Wolveridge (1980), A Funny Age (Growing up in North East London between the Wars) (1985). He was also writing Yes Mush: A Cockney Dictionary: The Cockney Language and Its World, intended to be published in 2004, but remaining unfinished at the end of his life.

In the late 1950s, he produced a series of illustrated panels on aspects of the history of Walthamstow, north-east London; these were published weekly in the Walthamstow Guardian. Later, he was a regular contributor to the Newham Recorder newspaper, producing some 1200 illustrated weekly articles for them during a 24-year period up to his death, and contributing also to other Recorder titles.

Robert Barltrop was President of the Waltham Forest Local History Society, and was a proud and respected member of the Old Monovians Association, the 'old boys' organisation of the Monoux School.

He was admitted to Newham General Hospital but died after a short illness on 26 April 2009.
