= Edgar Hardcastle =

Theoretician of Marxist economics (1899–1995)

Edgar Richard Hardcastle
- Born: 1899; Wandsworth, Surrey, England
- Died: 1995 (aged 95–96)
- Occupation: National Union of Agricultural and Allied Workers
- Years active: 1922–1995
- Known for: Socialist Standard; Socialist Party of Great Britain; Socialist Studies
- Notable work: Why Capitalism Will Not Collapse (1932)

Edgar Richard "Hardy" Hardcastle (1899 – June 1995) was a theoretician of Marxist economics.

The son of a founder member of the Socialist Party of Great Britain, Hardcastle went to prison as a socialist conscientious objector in the First World War, formally joining his father's party in 1922. After studying at the London School of Economics under Professor Edwin Cannan, he worked all his life as a researcher in the trade union movement, first for the National Union of Agricultural and Allied Workers, then for a short while for the international trade union movement in Brussels, then till his retirement for the Union of Post Office Workers where he was chief adviser to a succession of UPW General Secretaries.

His main interest was monetary economics. From the 1930s on, as his Socialist Standard articles (written under the pen name of H.) testify, he did battle against Keynes on behalf of Marx and also, on behalf of his old professor, Cannan. Edwin Cannan, a largely forgotten classical bourgeois economist from the Ricardian school of the early 20th century, could be described as the last of the classical political economists and, as such, shared with Marx certain economic views, in particular that inflation was a purely monetary phenomenon caused by an excessive issue of an inconvertible paper currency and that banks were merely financial intermediaries without any power to "create credit." Both of these positions were denied by Keynes whose views became part of the economic orthodoxy.

Hardcastle's empirical bent enabled the SPGB to refute, with the necessary statistical evidence, theories which have sometimes been attributed to Marx such as underconsumptionism, the increasing pauperisation of the working class, the collapse of capitalism (Hardcastle was the author of the famous 1932 SPGB pamphlet Why Capitalism Will Not Collapse) and—more controversially within the Party—the increasing severity of economic crises.

Hardcastle gave a great input into the SPGB, particularly to the Socialist Standard, serving on the editorial committee for over thirty years and contributing articles from the early 1920s onwards. He was also a member of the Executive Committee for decades and a Party lecturer and representative in debates (see Socialist Party of Great Britain debates) including cabinet minister Keith Joseph in 1974.

Towards the end of his life, Hardcastle found himself a member of one of two branches which were expelled by a poll of all the membership for deliberately and repeatedly refusing to apply a democratically arrived-at Conference decision. The two expelled branches went on to form the Socialist Studies group in 1991, of which Hardcastle remained a member until his death some four years later.
