= Cyril May (socialist) =

British socialist (1920–2003)

Cyril E. May
- Born: 1 December 1920
- Died: 8 October 2003 (aged 82)
- Years active: 1940–2003
- Known for: Socialist Party of Great Britain
- Spouse: Alison Assiter

Cyril Ernest May (1 December 1920 – 8 October 2003) was a British socialist. He joined the Socialist Party of Great Britain in 1940 and in 1944 became one of the party's accredited speakers. In 1950 he was running speakers' classes. He was one of the most formidable orators of the 1940s and 1950s, when outdoor public speaking was at its peak. He was one of the main voices for the Socialist Party of Great Britain, and could command audiences in Hyde Park of more than 1,000. As central organiser of the party, he arranged meetings, debates, conferences and dances. On behalf of the party in both 1960 when he gave radio interviews and 1970 he visited the companion party World Socialist Party of the United States in Boston. In 1991 he was a member of the two branches dissolved who founded the group Socialist Studies where May was central organiser.
