= Jack Fitzgerald (socialist) =

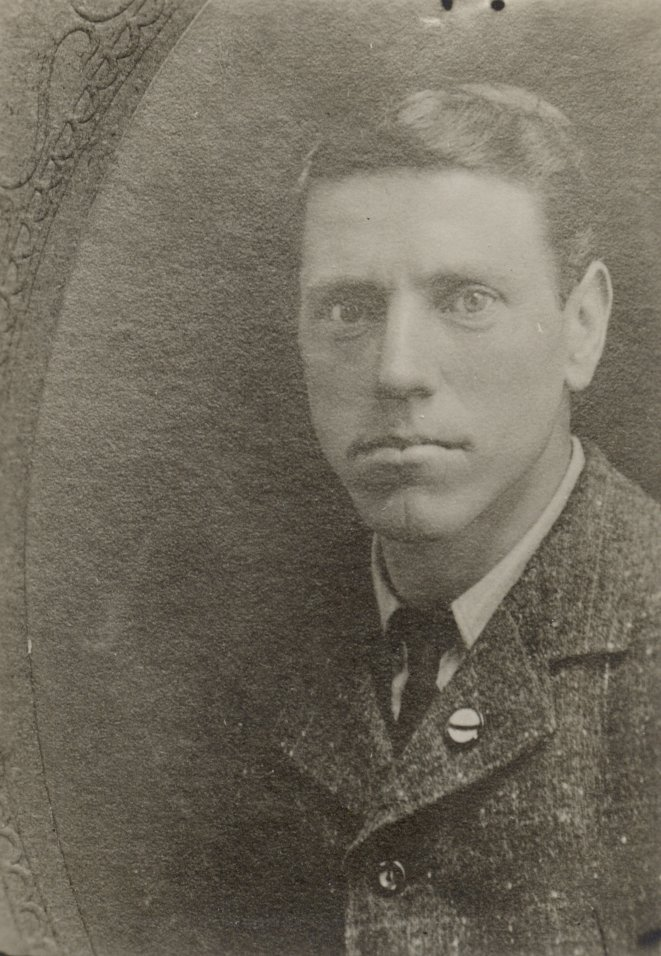
- Jack Fitzgerald
- Born: c. 1873
- Died: 16 April 1929 (aged 57); St Peter's Hospital, Covent Garden, London, England
- Occupation: Bricklayer
- Political party: Social Democratic Federation (until 1904); Socialist Party of Great Britain (from 1904)
- Movement: World Socialist Movement

Jack Fitzgerald (c. 1873 – 16 April 1929) was a founding member of the Socialist Party of Great Britain.

Fitzgerald was an Irishman who had settled in London, and had joined the socialist movement after becoming a secularist, embracing socialism after attending a debate between secularist Charles Bradlaugh and socialist Henry Hyndman. "Fitz", as he was known, was a very well known indoor and outdoor speaker for the SPGB – two of his debates were issued as pamphlets: The Socialist Party and the Liberal Party (1911) and Socialism and Tariff Reform (1912)—and was a prolific writer for the Socialist Standard. He was an SPGB Executive Committee member continuously from 1905 until his death in 1929 and was also on the Editorial Committee for most of that time. He was also secretary of Clerkenwell branch from 1905 to 1906.

By trade he was a bricklayer (as were George Hicks and F. K. Cadman) and after 1913 was on the teaching staff at the LCC School of Building at Brixton. He was an active trade unionist (Operative Bricklayers' Society) and a cyclist, designing and building his own bicycles. Fitzgerald had been active in the Social Democratic Federation from around the turn of the century, being a public speaker and a delegate to SDF Conferences in 1901 (Central branch) and 1902 (Burnbank). Whilst a member of the SDF he had taught classes for the party on Marx's Capital, where one of his students was Thomas A. Jackson, who described him as "very nearly the best-read man I have ever met". Along with Horace Hawkins he was expelled by the SDF at its 1904 Conference at Burnley, an action which led to the formation of the Socialist Party of Great Britain. This was chiefly as a result of his unauthorised economics classes, which were continued under SPGB auspices. He was a member of the Provisional Committee of May 1904.

Harry Wicks described Fitzgerald in his book Keeping My Head:

…fearless in debate, he was so confident in his own party case that he would take on anyone, be they small fry or big cheese. His style as debater was to treat his opponent, from whatever party—Tory, Liberal, Labour, ILP or Communist—as the exponent of the policy of their party. He invariably knew more about the programme and published material of his opponents' party than did his actual adversary. To get to grips, not with a brilliant speech but with the written word, was his method, the apt quotation to clinch an argument. If challenged, he would dive into his trunk of books to produce the evidence. His audience loved it.

Fitzgerald died of kidney disease on 16 April 1929 in St Peter's Hospital, aged 57.
