= Socialist Standard =

- Socialist Standard, February, 2008
- Former editors: Robert Elrick; Edgar Hardcastle; Gilbert McLatchie
- Frequency: Monthly
- Publisher: Socialist Party of Great Britain
- Founded: September 1904; 121 years ago
- Country: United Kingdom
- Based in: London
- Language: English
- Website: worldsocialism.org/spgb/socialist-standard/
- ISSN: 0037-8259

Socialist Standard is a monthly socialist magazine published without interruption since September 1904 by the Socialist Party of Great Britain (SPGB). The magazine is written in a simple, direct style and focuses mainly on socialist advocacy and Marxian analysis of current events, particularly those affecting the United Kingdom. Some articles have been published in party pamphlets.

== History ==
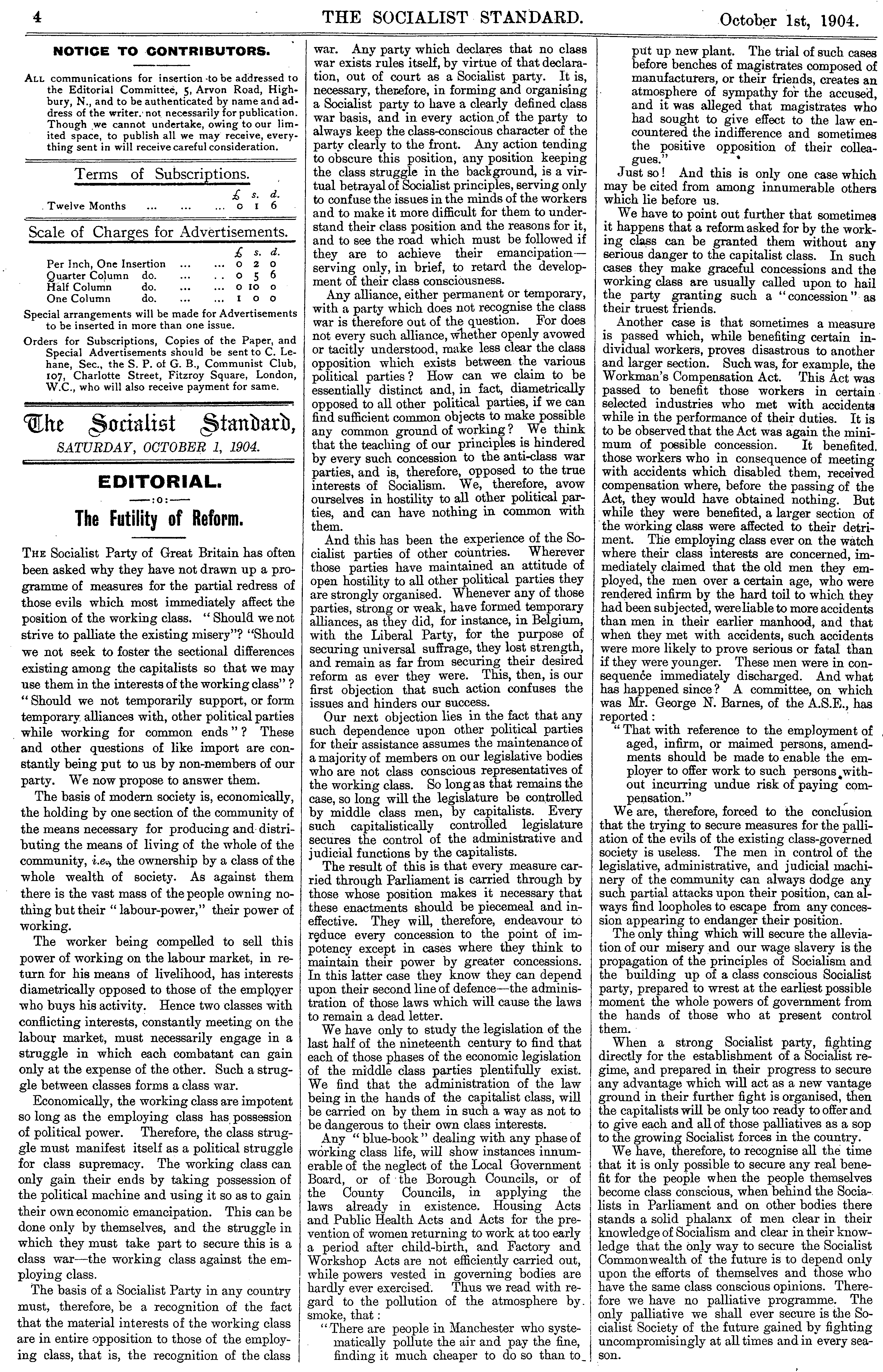
October 1904 editorial of the Socialist Standard second issue

The first editor was Robert Elrick. The Socialist Standard has also carried translations of continental writers. Under the Defence of the Realm Act 1914, it was placed on a secret list of papers and magazines banned for export during World War I for its call for workers to refuse to fight for their countries and instead join the class war. In 1915, it published an article written by a member of the Bolshevik party calling for a socialist solution to the war. In 1918, the paper voiced the first doubts of the SPGB regarding the Bolshevik Revolution in Russia.

Edgar Hardcastle began a long period of contributions in the 1920s leading eventually to an over thirty-year editorship of the Socialist Standard. In the 1930s, it drew on the reports from Spain to produce articles on the looming menace of aerial warfare. During World War II, the magazine evaded the censor largely by producing a series of articles on the Peloponnesian and similar ancient wars as a cover for the SPGB's opposition to the current one.

== Centenary ==
To celebrate the party's centenary in 2004, seventy articles were selected from over ten thousand from its history were compiled and published in May in a book called Socialism or Your Money Back. The June 2004 issue of the Socialist Standard was a special issue to commemorate the party centenary and detail the party history. The September 2004 issue of the Socialist Standard was a special issue to commemorate the publication centenary of the Socialist Standard.

== Present ==
The SPGB maintains that it is not a left-wing organisation nor the Socialist Standard a left-wing journal. "Left-wing", it contends, has simply become an umbrella designation for protest groups and organisations demanding amendments and reforms to capitalism. The SPGB and the World Socialist Movement (with which the SPGB is associated), contrary to the views and aspirations of these myriad groups and organisations that would claim to be left-wing, affirms that capitalism is incapable of meaningful reform and that quintessentially the basis of the exploitation of the working class is the wages/money system.

According to Richard Montague:

The SPGB holds that the limping democracy extant in most countries today, and certainly, in the developed countries, can be used as a weapon of social revolution; if the majority desired a socialist society, a wageless, classless, moneyless condition wherein goods and services were produced solely for need, there is no power capable of resisting its demand.

== Former editors ==
- Robert Elrick
- Jack Fitzgerald
- Albert E. Jacomb
- Adolph Kohn
- Edgar Hardcastle
- Gilbert McLatchie (Gilmac)
- Harry Waite
- Ralph Critchfield
- Stan Hampson
- Eddie Critchfield
- John Crump
- Robert Barltrop
- Gwynn Thomas
- Alan D'Arcy
- Pat Deutz
- Melvin Tenner
- Janie Percy-Smith
- Judith Skinner
- Paul Bennett

== See also ==
- Western Socialist

== Bibliography ==
- Socialism Or Your Money Back. The Socialist Party of Great Britain. 2004. ISBN 0-9544733-1-0.
- Russia 1917–1967 A Socialist Analysis. The Socialist Party of Great Britain. 1967. OCLC 477213388.
- Centenary of the Russian Revolution. The Socialist Party of Great Britain. 2017.
