= Tension and Trauma Releasing Exercises =

Stress reduction medical technique

Tension and Trauma Releasing Exercises (TRE), also known as Trauma Releasing Exercises, is a body based stress reduction method developed in the early 2000s by David Berceli. The method consists of a sequence of physical exercises intended to induce involuntary muscular tremors, referred to as "neurogenic tremors" by proponents. TRE has been described as a somatic or body-oriented approach to stress management.

== Background and development ==
TRE was developed by David Berceli, a trauma intervention educator who earned his PhD in social work from Arizona State University. While working in conflict affected regions including Lebanon and Sudan, Berceli reported observing that children often exhibited spontaneous tremor responses during or after acute stress, in contrast to adults who tended to suppress such responses. Based on these observations and on somatic therapy traditions, he proposed that tremoring may represent an innate physiological stress regulation mechanism. Berceli formalized the approach in his 2009 doctoral dissertation at Arizona State University, which evaluated a set of stress reduction exercises aimed to invoke mild tremors in a pilot sample group.

Since then, the modality has spread through training programs and been evaluated for both general and specialized usage. In 2011, the Defense Centers of Excellence for Psychological Health and Traumatic Brain Injury included TRE in a review of mind-body modalities for military populations, noting its ease of use, potential for autonomic regulation and previous usage with traumatized civilians exposed to natural or war-related disasters. The technique was further documented for military usage in a 2019 case report published in the Journal of Military and Veterans' Health, as a self-care intervention for a veteran with PTSD. The exercises are practiced internationally, with more than 1,000 certified TRE providers operating across dozens of countries as of 2026.

== Method ==
The TRE protocol typically consists of physical exercises involving stretching and mild muscular fatigue, particularly of the psoas and leg muscles. After these preparatory exercises, participants lie in a supine position and allow involuntary tremors to emerge. These tremors occur spontaneously and vary in intensity and distribution without conscious effort. TRE is presented by its developer as a self-regulation practice rather than a psychotherapy and does not require verbal processing of traumatic memories.

== Theoretical basis ==
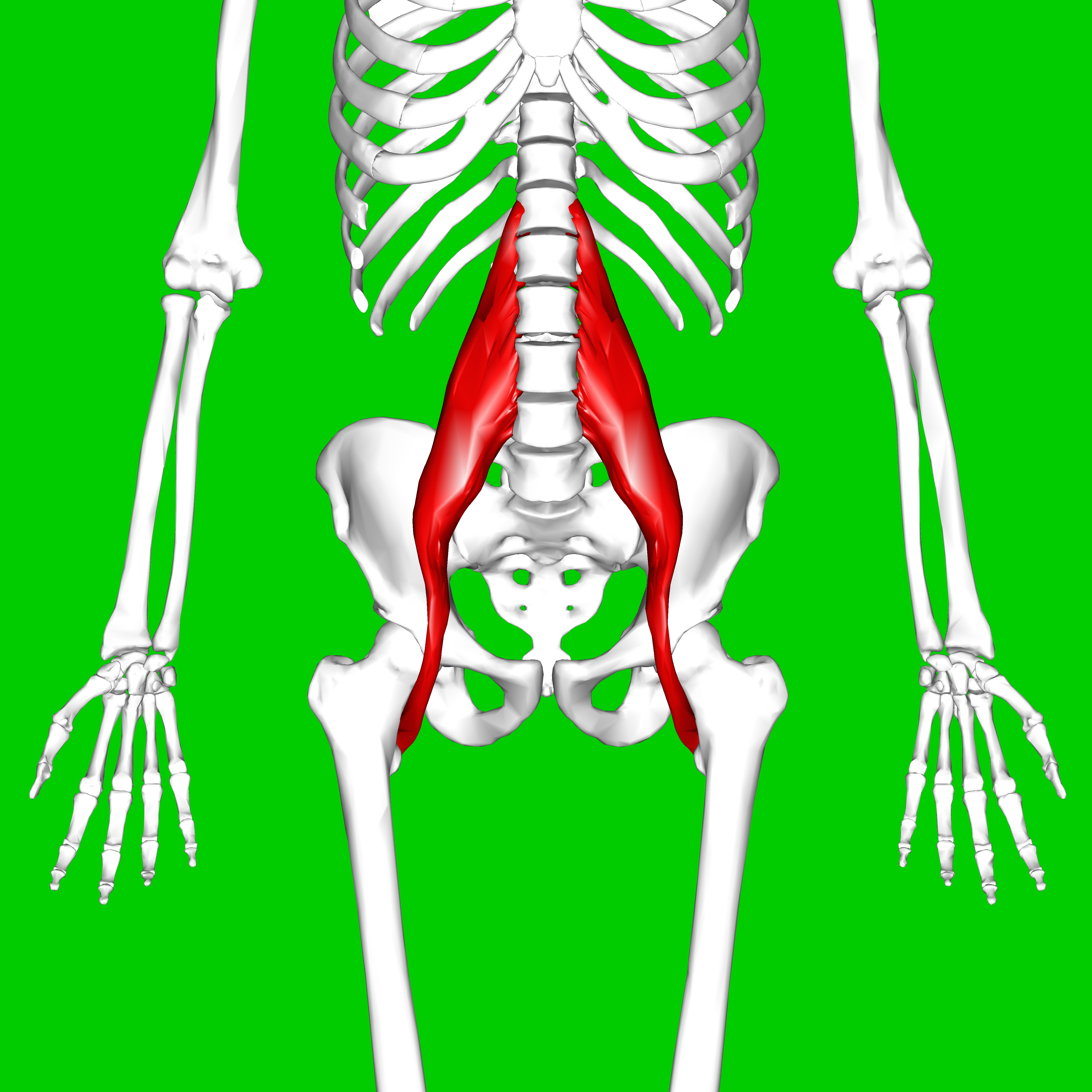
The psoas major muscle (shown in red) is central to the TRE method

TRE draws conceptually from the tradition of body psychotherapy, an approach historically associated with the work of Wilhelm Reich. Reich introduced the concept of muscular armor, the idea that chronic psychological stress manifests as persistent muscular tension. Subsequent somatic theorists including Alexander Lowen, who developed bioenergetic analysis, expanded these ideas through physical exercises aimed at releasing held tension. TRE continued this lineage by proposing that neurogenic tremors are the primary vehicle for physiological and psychological discharge.

Supporters suggest that inducing muscular tremors may activate neuromuscular reflexes and help the nervous system to regulate itself. Some practitioners and researchers have situated TRE within the framework of polyvagal theory, developed by Stephen Porges; Porges and Berceli have appeared together in published academic contexts exploring the relationship between neurogenic tremors and autonomic regulation. However, the specific connection between TRE and polyvagal theory has not been established in clinical research.

== Research ==
Research into TRE has primarily consisted of pilot studies and small-scale trials. Initial evaluations include a 2014 study of informal caregivers that reported improvements in quality of life over a ten week protocol, though the sample was small and uncontrolled. In 2018, German psychotherapist Susanne Winkler examined neurogenic tremors as a potential component of trauma treatment, reviewing practical experience and theoretical considerations. Researchers have also studied neurogenic tremors as a treatment for restless legs syndrome, though a 2018 randomized controlled trial found no significant difference between the intervention and control groups.

Studies in populations with multiple sclerosis (MS) have yielded mixed results; a 2021 pilot study reported improvements in self-reported measures, while objective measures of spasticity showed no statistically significant change. This was followed by a larger randomized controlled trial published in 2025, which found that TRE significantly reduced reported levels of pain and spasticity, though the findings remain preliminary.

A scoping review conducted in 2023 identified 18 intervention studies, reporting possible improvements in stress and mood-related outcomes. However, the review characterized the existing body of evidence as preliminary and tentative due to variability in methodological quality. It concluded that more rigorous research is required before the technique can be considered part of evidence-based practice. A study protocol for a randomized controlled trial evaluating a neurogenic tremor-based intervention as a supplement for treating emotional disorders in adolescents was published in 2024.

== Criticism and skepticism ==
Writing for Science-Based Medicine in 2020, physician Harriet Hall argued that TRE's central theoretical claim, that induced tremors release stored trauma, lacked biological plausibility and supporting evidence. Critics have also noted that much of the published research has involved small exploratory studies and independent replication remains limited. The 2023 Roos scoping review noted the presence of less rigorous methodologies among the 18 studies it analyzed.

== Safety ==
Published studies have reported TRE to be well tolerated in small samples, though systematic safety data is limited. Practitioners advise individuals with significant medical conditions or a complex trauma history to consult health professionals before attempting the exercises.

== See also ==
- Body psychotherapy
- Bioenergetic analysis
- Wilhelm Reich
- Alexander Lowen
- Somatic experiencing
- Polyvagal theory
