= Catherine Fitzmaurice =

Catherine Fitzmaurice is the originator of Fitzmaurice Voicework, whose purpose "is to support people in finding and using their unique voices — in healthy, clear, and creative ways — while developing greater freedom and presence" and which is taught in acting schools, studios, workshops, and private lessons throughout the United States and the world. The January 2010 issue of American Theatre magazine (published by the Theatre Communications Group) calls Fitzmaurice one of "the great lions of the field of voice work in the U.S." and one of the "visionary innovators in the craft" of voice training for actors. Over the past thirty-five years, she has "become one of the half-dozen most influential voice teachers in the theatre," whose "legacy and enduring influence are secure." The Voice and Speech Trainers Association invited Fitzmaurice to its 2009 National Conference—along with Arthur Lessac, Kristin Linklater, and Patsy Rodenburg—as one of the "foremost vocal teachers of our time."

== Biography ==
Born in India, Fitzmaurice began acting at the age of three. At the age of seven, her family moved to England and then Ireland, and she attended English boarding schools in Surrey and Hertfordshire. From age eleven to seventeen, she studied voice, speech, verse-speaking, and acting with Barbara Bunch, who had also taught Cicely Berry as a teenager. Fitzmaurice went on to win a three-year scholarship at the Central School of Speech and Drama in London, where she earned numerous honors and distinctions. While studying at Central, she also took first place in the English Festival of Spoken Poetry. Upon completion or her training, Fitzmaurice returned to Central in 1965 as a teacher of Voice, Verse-Speaking, and Prose-Reading.

While living in London, Fitzmaurice met her future husband, David Kozubei, who at one point worked as a manager of the "underground wing" of Better Books then on Charing Cross Road. Kozubei introduced Fitzmaurice to the works of Wilhelm Reich, which Fitzmaurice first explored through a group Kozubei had founded "to study Reich’s work in a practical way" (including his own method of muscle tension reduction called "Movements"). Fitzmaurice's curiosity led her to study bioenergetic analysis (or “Bioenergetics”) with Dr. Alexander Lowen and Malcolm Brown, the latter of which she worked with until she relocated to the United States in 1968. After taking up residency in Ann Arbor, Michigan – where she earned a B.A. in English and an M.A. in Theatre Studies from the University of Michigan – Fitzmaurice continued to explore Reich's work with several of Reich's trainees, including Dr. John Pierrakos. Fitzmaurice began to practice yoga in 1972, and her interest in "body-based disciplines and energy work" soon had her exploring shiatsu, meditation, and healing techniques as well as traditional voice and speech pedagogy. Fitzmaurice also holds Certificates from the International Phonetic Association and from the completion of "several bodywork and healing energy trainings," including certification as a Somatic Therapist.

Throughout all of her investigations, Fitzmaurice was also teaching, primarily for actors and performers. As a teacher both in London and the United States, she "found that some of [her students] were incapable of being fully vocally expressive," primarily due to "inhibition caused by tension, particularly around breathing." Her search for "methods of reducing body tension in faster and more radical ways than the voice work … at the Central School" was what led to her initial interest in Reich and her ongoing exploration of various relaxation techniques. Fitzmaurice's experimentation in combining Reichian bioenergetics with her classical training in voice and speech led to the inception of Fitzmaurice Voicework, which continued to grow and expand with the adaptation of Fitzmaurice's discoveries in yoga, shiatsu, and other psychophysical systems. Fitzmaurice cites her "five years spent teaching at Oakland University's Academy of Dramatic Art in Michigan" as her "most fertile time" in the development of the Voicework, a time when she was able to synthesize her diverse interests with "nobody overseeing what [she] did." In her early years in the United States, Fitzmaurice also worked as an actor, most notably at the American Conservatory Theater and in the Southern California area.

In addition to teaching at the Central School and Oakland University, Fitzmaurice has taught at the Juilliard School's Drama Division, Yale School of Drama, Harvard University, New York University, Circle in the Square Theatre, American Conservatory Theater, the University of Southern California, the University of California, Los Angeles, the Moscow Art Theatre, the Stratford Shakespearean Festival, the Guthrie Theatre, and the Lincoln Center. Fitzmaurice continues to teach workshops, intensives, and teacher certifications across the world while maintaining a regular presence in both Los Angeles and New York City. She has been invited to lecture and conduct workshops in numerous venues across the world, including: the Roy Hart Center in France; the Performance Breath Conference at the Royal Academy of Dramatic Art in London; the Purnati Arts Centre in Bali; the Congreso de Voz in Chile; and the annual conferences of both the Association for Theatre in Higher Education and the Voice and Speech Trainers Association. Fitzmaurice Voicework is taught at over one hundred colleges, universities, and studios worldwide by certified teachers, all of whom must complete a multi-week Certification Program taught by Fitzmaurice on a semi-annual basis in New York City and Los Angeles. One of Fitzmaurice's two sons, Saul Kotzubei, is among the thirteen Master Teachers with up to thirty years’ experience in teaching the Voicework, and he currently teaches and leads workshops in the Los Angeles area and oversees the Fitzmaurice Institute. Her younger son, Jacob Kotzubei, is a private equity professional.
