= Dancemeditation =

Dancemeditation is a moving meditation system incorporating art, somatics and the mysticism of Sufism. The practice was developed in 1995 by Dunya Dianne McPherson after completing 1001 days of Sufi training with Sufi Master Adnan Sarhan. The materials resourced provide doorways and ignition points to embodied spiritual illumination, healing, and growth. Teaching Dancemeditation means to come from the embodied practices that have been honed within the practicing Dancemeditation community over the past 20 years.

Dancemeditation can be done alone, as a personal practice. It is primarily offered in group environments with approximately 2/3–3/4 of the session engaged in shared, side-by-side solitude with the remaining time devoted to group interaction. "Shared Solitude" can include quiet exercises with eyes closed on one's mat, to active dancing with eyes closed. Group interactions include partner and small group exercises, entire group improvisation, and circles led by individuals. Dancemeditation is occasionally offered in private session according to the teacher's preference, demographic, and goals. There is an annual Movement Monastery which is a retreat period under the direction of Principal Teacher Dunya Dianne McPherson.

The official school of Dancemeditation is a network of independent, inter-connected teachers who have completed an intensive Certification training with Founder. The training is completed primarily at Movement Monastery which includes time in a secluded setting to focus on practices, body cleansing diet, spiritual discussion, and silence. In order to receive the initial Certificate level, teachers have completed 80 days of dedicated training. Advanced Levels of Teaching Certification with more stringent criteria follow. Teachers offer work in various formats and locations. Many events are public offerings. In addition, Dancemeditation teachers work through institutional settings—universities, hospitals, school systems.

== Spirituality vs. religious systems ==
Dancemeditation allows practitioners to explore and experience that which is deep, profound, and spiritual without having to adopt or contain that experience in a belief system. In Dancemeditation, practitioners are free to follow their own intuition to where it needs to leads them. A helpful guiding comment comes from Sufi Shervin Nekuee, (director of the Mystic Festival in Netherlands.) "Who am I to judge your mysticism?" regarding Dancemeditation as a Sufi practice.

Dancemeditation doesn't ask its practitioners to define a higher power, or even have one, nor does it prevent them from having one. It is primarily an ecumenical spiritual system, or a spiritual system that embraces interfaith pluralism. There has never been, nor will there be, a request to follow doctrine.

The Path of Dancemeditation is a full valid Path in itself. It is not an ancillary discipline to any other established Path. At the same time, the Path of Dancemeditation does not obstruct practitioners from including other work on an equal level with the Path of Dancemeditation within their own hearts and efforts.

== The music ==
The music for Dancemeditation is primarily acoustic or "mildly enhanced". Genres include world music, contemplative, classical, folk much of which has no lyrics or lyrics in languages that students will not typically understand. This allows for deeper levels of concentration within the Self as opposed to the lyrics moving the emotions.

== Basic components ==
Basic components include:

- Rocking array: Rocking the body with focus on specific body parts.
- Sand tracings: executed from a prone position this series of exercises.
- Opening sequence: a breath-based series of repetitive stretches.

Basic practice subjects include:

- Breath dances: Rhythmic and non-rhythmic breathing.
- Gesture: Hands are most commonly used in gesturing, but the whole body or parts of it can create gestures.
- Deep state motion: "Deep State" practices are a direct handing of the lineage of Sufism.
- Sufi whirling: Whirling is a Sufi purification practice most commonly associated with the Whirling Dervishes of the Mevlevi Order of Sufi.

Spiritual belly dance components of Dancemeditation consists of the following subjects and exercises.

- Vibration
  - Rocking: Rocking the body in parts or as a whole.
  - Fragmentation: Breaking down movement into smaller and smaller parts, or "micromotions".
- Undulation
  - Ornamental movement: Drawing curves with the body, in part or whole.
  - Fascia awareness: Attention to the connective tissue brings deeper focus with greater sensitivity to subtle movement.
  - Non-rhythmic breath extends movement beyond the normal breath pulse.
- Veil work: Use of a silk veil draws attention to imagery, design, tempo and sensation.
- Layers and momentum: The exercises used to develop physical awareness and deep focus through "micromotion", breathing and repetition are combined.

== Training ==
Spiritual belly dance has been offered at Kripalu since 2009. Summer Movement Monasteries are offered yearly for two weeks in June. Long and short training intensives, weekly classes, gatherings, performances and workshops are offered by Dunya, as well as by over 30 licensed instructors, internationally.

== See also ==
- 5Rhythms
- Dance therapy
- Mind-body intervention
- Somatic experiencing
- Somatic psychology
- Sacred dance
