= William Schutz =

American psychologist (1925–2002)

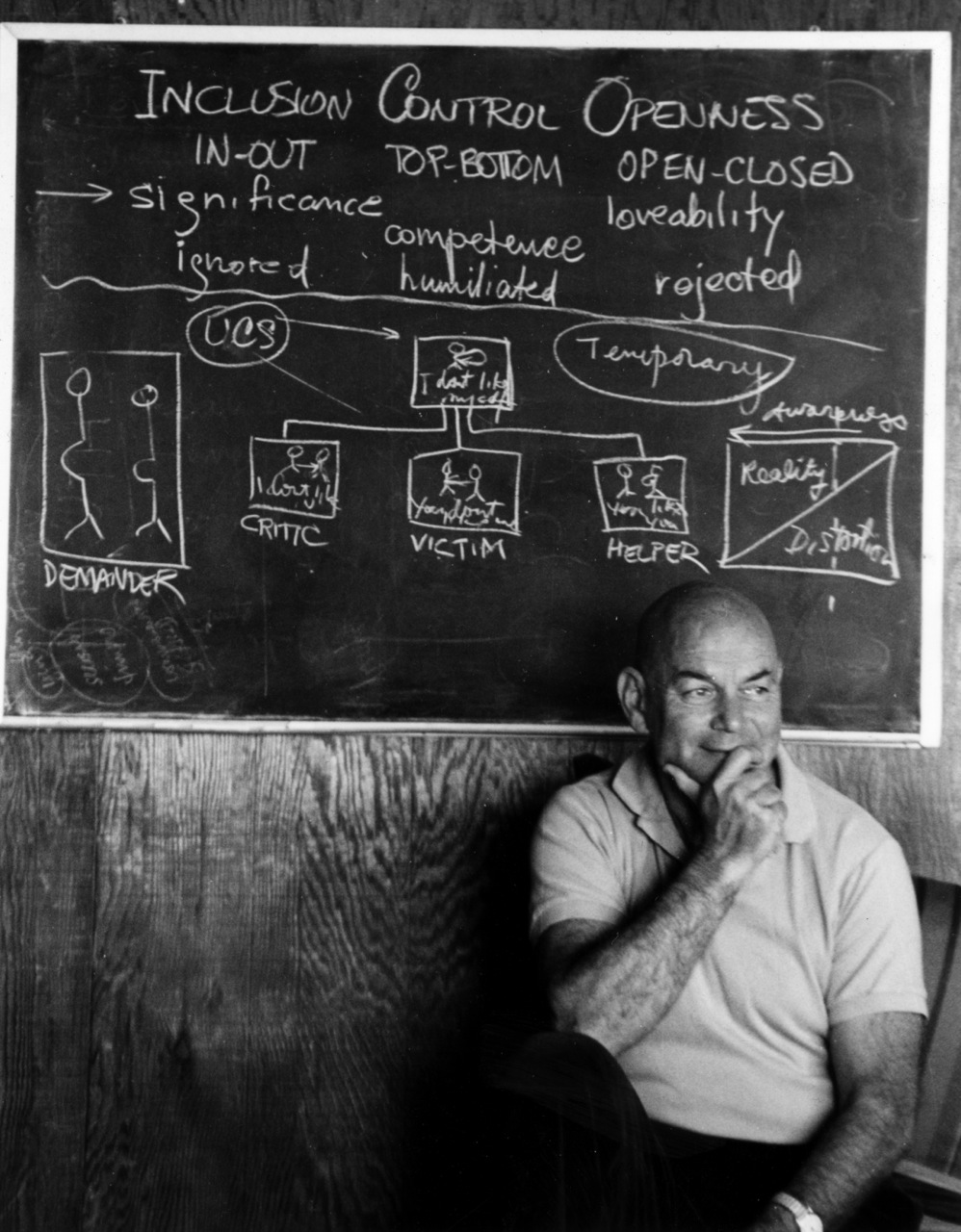
Esalen Institute, circa 1987

William Schutz (December 19, 1925 – November 9, 2002) was an American psychologist.

== Biography ==
Schutz was born in Chicago, Illinois. He practiced at the Esalen Institute in the 1960s. He later became the president of BConWSA International. He received his Ph.D. from UCLA. In the 1950s, he was part of the peer-group at the University of Chicago's Counseling Center that included Carl Rogers, Thomas Gordon, Abraham Maslow and Elias Porter. He taught at Tufts University, Harvard University, University of California, Berkeley and the Albert Einstein College of Medicine, and was chairman of the holistic studies department at Antioch University until 1983.

In 1958, Schutz introduced a theory of interpersonal relations he called Fundamental Interpersonal Relations Orientation (FIRO). According to the theory three dimensions of interpersonal relations were deemed to be necessary and sufficient to explain most human interaction: Inclusion, Control and Affection. These dimensions have been used to assess group dynamics.

Schutz also created FIRO-B, a measurement instrument with scales that assess the behavioral aspects of the three dimensions. His advancement of FIRO Theory beyond the FIRO-B tool was most obvious in the change of the "Affection" scale to the "Openness" scale in the "FIRO Element-B". This change highlighted his newer theory that behavior comes from feelings ("FIRO Element-F") and the self-concept ("FIRO Element-S"). "Underlying the behavior of openness is the feeling of being likable or unlikeable, lovable or unlovable. I find you likable if I like myself in your presence, if you create an atmosphere within which I like myself."

W. Schutz authored more than ten books and many articles. His work was influenced by Alexander Lowen, Ida Pauline Rolf and Moshe Feldenkrais. As a body therapist he led encounter group workshops focussing on the underlying causes of illnesses and developing alternative body-centered cures. His books, "Profound Simplicity" and "The Truth Option," address this theme. He brought new approaches to body therapy that integrated truth, choice (freedom), (self) responsibility, self-esteem, self-regard and honesty into his approach.

In his books one encounters the concept of energy cycles (e.g. Schutz 1979) which a person goes through or call for completion. The single steps of the energy cycles are: motivation – prepare – act – feel.

Schutz died at his home in Muir Beach, California in 2002.

== Influences ==
While teaching and doing research at Harvard, the University of Chicago, the University of California at Berkeley, and other institutions, Schutz focused on psychology but also studied philosophy—in particular, the scientific method, the philosophy of science, logical empiricism, and research design (with both Hans Reichenbach and Abraham Kaplan). He also worked with Paul Lazarsfeld, the well-known sociologist and methodologist and Elvin Semrad, professor of psychiatry at Harvard Medical School and clinical director in charge of psychiatric residency training at the Massachusetts Mental Health Center. For Schutz, Semrad was a key figure, "a brilliant, earthy psychoanalyst who became my main mentor about groups."

An avid student, Schutz also learned T-group methodology ("T" for training) at the National Training Laboratories (NTL) at Bethel, Maine, psychosynthesis, a spiritually oriented technique involving imagery, devised by an Italian contemporary of Freud named Roberto Assagioli, psychodrama with Hannah Weiner, bioenergetics with Alexander Lowen and John Pierrakos, Rolfing with Ida Rolf, and Gestalt Therapy with Paul Goodman. In his own words, "I tried everything physical, psychological, and spiritual—all diets, all therapies, all body methods, jogging, meditating, visiting a guru in India, and fasting for thirty-four days on water. These experiences counterbalanced my twenty years in science and left me with a strong desire to integrate the scientific with the experiential."

== Writings ==
- FIRO: A Three-Dimensional Theory of Interpersonal Behavior. New York, NY: Rinehart (1958)
- Joy. Expanding Human Awareness (1967)
- Here comes Everybody Harper & Row (1971)
- Elements of Encounter (1973)
- Body Fantasy (1976)
- Leaders of Schools (1977)
- Profound Simplicity. New York, NY: Bantam (1979)
- The Truth Option. Berkeley, CA: Ten Speed Press (1984)
- Joy: Twenty Years Later. Berkeley, CA: Ten Speed Press (1989)
- "Beyond FIRO-B—Three New Theory Derived Measures—Element B: Behavior, Element F: Feelings, Element S: Self." Psychological Reports, June, 70, 915-937 (1992)
- The Human Element: Productivity, Self-Esteem and the Bottom Line. San Francisco, CA: Jossey-Bass (1994)
