= Arnold Mindell =

American author and psychoanalyst (1940–2024)

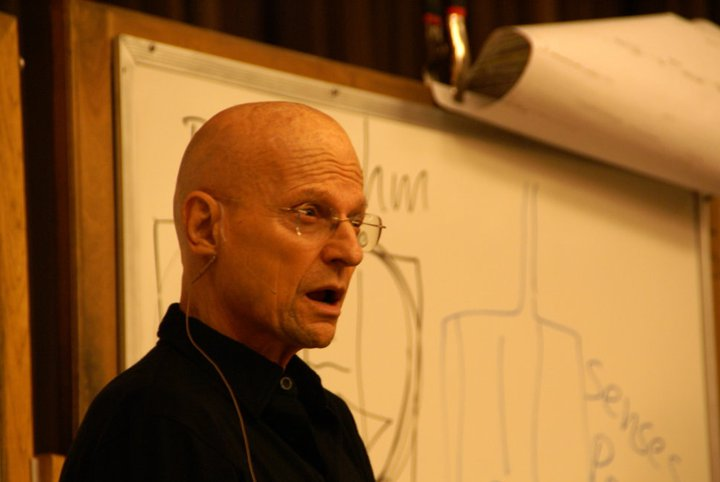
- Mindell in 2011
- Born: January 1, 1940; Schenectady, New York, U.S.
- Died: June 10, 2024 (aged 84)
- Occupations: Writer, psychoanalyst
- Spouse: Amy Mindell
- Website: http://www.aamindell.net/

Arnold Mindell (January 1, 1940 – June 10, 2024) was an American author, therapist, and teacher in the fields of transpersonal psychology, body psychotherapy, social change, and spirituality. He is known for extending Jungian dream analysis to body symptoms, promoting ideas of 'deep democracy,' and interpreting concepts from physics and mathematics in psychological terms. Mindell is the founder of process oriented psychology, or process work, a development of Jungian psychology influenced by Taoism, shamanism, and physics.

== Biography ==
Arnold Mindell was born in Schenectady, New York. He studied applied physics at the Massachusetts Institute of Technology, and then at the ETH Zürich, Switzerland. Mindell was introduced to Jungian psychology in Switzerland following a chance encounter with Franz Niklaus Riklin, then president of the C.G. Jung Institute. Mindell subsequently entered analysis with Riklin and Marie-Louise von Franz and trained as a Jungian analyst at the Jung Institute. He had a Ph.D. in psychology from the Union Institute.

Mindell received the Jungian analyst diploma in 1970 and worked at the C. G. Jung Institute as a teacher and training analyst until he left in 1985. In the early 1980s, Mindell and colleagues began the first training program for process oriented psychology, in Zürich; and in 1982 founded what is now known as the Institute for Process Work (Institut für Prozessarbeit IPA), an accredited training institute for psychotherapy in Switzerland.

In the late 1980s, Mindell and his wife, Amy Mindell, moved back to the United States from Switzerland, causing some controversy in the small coastal town of Yachats, Oregon, with plans to build a seminar venue. In 1990, Mindell and colleagues established a center for teaching process oriented psychology in Portland, Oregon, now known as the Process Work Institute, which in 2001 was the subject of a controversial ethics complaint. The Mindells settled in Oregon, and in 2013 were invited by the Yachats Academy of Arts and Sciences to present a lecture on their conflict resolution and open forum work around the world.

Mindell features prominently in Micah Toub's 2010 memoir Growing Up Jung. Toub represents Mindell as a charismatic, unconventional post-Jungian teacher and psychotherapist who was a "a guru-like figure" for Toub's parents.

Arnold Mindell died on June 10, 2024, at the age of 84.

== Work ==
=== Overview ===
Mindell founded and developed process oriented psychology, or process work. Core ideas include his 'dreambody' concept and the application of psychology to social issues and conflict resolution in large groups, known as 'worldwork' and the principle of 'deep democracy.' Mindell's first book, Dreambody: The Body's Role in Revealing the Self (1982), linked 'the mind's dreaming process with illness and physical symptoms as well as with disciplines such as yoga and tai chi.' Mindell is known for suggesting that 'symptoms are dreams trying to come true.'

Stanislav Grof has described Mindell as one of the 'pioneers of transpersonal psychology.' In 2012, Mindell was one of five people recognized with a Pioneer Award from the US Association of Body Psychotherapy. He is a holder of the World Certificate for Psychotherapy awarded by the World Council for Psychotherapy.

In the 2017 critical exploration of the relationship between African Americans and C.G. Jung's analytical psychology, Fanny Brewster describes Mindell's dreambody work and his linking of body symptoms and psychological development. Brewster finds that Mindell's development of Jungian ideas are aligned with traditional African concepts of healing which link mind and body:

'I believe that Mindell's approach to dreamwork with its emphasis on body healing mirrors the African system of healing's inclusiveness of body and mind in the process.'

Mindell has been described as 'a natural interculturalist who excels at building relationships across cultural boundaries.' Mindell's intercultural skills include a focus on the importance of nonverbal elements of communication and the 'ability to switch viewpoints and join the other's reality.'

Mindell has been the subject of two Thinking Allowed programs, the independent television series hosted by Jeffrey Mishlove. He has been interviewed on Shrink Rap Radio (2008), New Dimensions Radio (2009, 1995) and Somatic Perspectives on Psychotherapy (2009).

=== Criticism ===
Mindell has been criticised for teaching New Age concepts and practices that are unclear and unknown within the mainstream of psychology; and it is noted that he is not licensed as a clinical psychologist in Oregon. Mindell's dreambody work has been criticized as a form of 'metaphysical healthcare'; while another commentator referred to process oriented psychology as an example of a transpersonal psychology with the potential, he claimed, to be misused as a form of 'mind control.'

=== Key ideas ===
The 'dreambody' concept was developed in the 1970s while Mindell was a practicing Jungian analyst, derived from his observation of connections between people's dreams and their body symptoms and published in Dreambody: the Body's Role in Revealing the Self (Routledge, 1982). Mindell's therapeutic technique has been compared to Fritz Perls: "The most striking difference, at least from Perls himself, is one of mood – Mindell's work is playful, supportive and permissive rather than confrontational." Another commentator writes: "Mindell … exemplifies both the good and bad of contemporary dreamwork. On the first score: there is a bit of flim-flam about Mindell. And he conspicuously overemploys the first person singular while extolling non-ego functions. Also, he interprets disease processes so positively that they begin to lose their catagogic authenticity. But on the second score: he is inventive, creative, intuitive, holistic, and affirmative. He breaks down prevailing categories and finds authentic meanings where our culture traditionally does not. And he helps people."

In 1995, Mindell extended the dreambody concept to a theory and practice of working with people in coma and near death states; this work inspired a UK theatre production by Improbable theatre. In his 1988 book, City Shadows: Psychological Interventions in Psychiatry, Mindell presented his approach to psychiatric disorders, drug addiction and intellectual disability. The book provides verbatim case studies describing interventions focused on the meaning of the patient's unusual communication, including non-verbal signals.

Mindell's 1990 book, Working on Yourself Alone: Inner Dreambody Work, presents a meditation practice that focuses attention on subtle body experiences and amplifies them to reveal unexpected information and meaning for the meditator. It provides a model for creative spiritual practice involving inner reflection and personal development. In the 2002 work, Dreaming while Awake: Techniques for 24-hour Lucid Dreaming, Mindell built on ideas of lucid dreaming, indigenous traditions and Zen Buddhism to create an awareness practice for daily life: paying attention to thoughts and perceptions that are normally dismissed, which he calls 'flirts' from the 'Dreaming.'

Mindell also published books dealing with large group conflict resolution and leadership, notably The Leader as Martial Artist: An Introduction to Deep Democracy (1992) and Sitting in the fire: Large Group Transformation Using Conflict and Diversity (1995). Mindell advances a concept and principle he calls 'deep democracy' and the approach has been compared to the work of Danaan Parry. Mindell's group conflict work has been reported within a business setting and within large community forums working with racism and other social tensions. Mindell's concept of 'rank,' published in his book Sitting in the Fire, has been used to support greater gender awareness in mediation training.

Mindell's work is known for proposing analogies between the concepts of mathematics, classical and quantum physics and psychological experiences; his books include simple exercises to guide the reader to explore their own experience of these ideas.

== Works ==
- Mindell, A. (2019) The Leader's 2nd Training: For Your Life and Our World. Gatekeeper Press. ISBN 978-1642374322
- Mindell, A. (2017) Conflict: Phases, Forums, and Solutions: For our Dreams and Body, Organizations, Governments, and Planet. CreateSpace. ISBN 978-1540770448
- Mindell, A. (2013) Dance of the Ancient One. Deep Democracy Exchange. ISBN 978-1619710153
- Mindell, A. (2007). Earth-Based Psychology: Path Awareness from the Teachings of Don Juan, Richard Feynman, and Lao Tse. Portland, OR: Lao Tse Press. ISBN 1-887078-75-4
- Mindell, A. (2004) The Quantum Mind and Healing. Charlottesville, VA: Hampton Road Publishing Company ISBN 1-57174-395-2
- Mindell, Arnold; Mindell, Amy (2002) Riding the Horse Backwards: Process Work in Theory and Practice (Foundation Series). Lao Tse Press ISBN 1-887078-68-1, 978-1887078689
- Mindell, A. (2000). Dreaming While Awake: Techniques for 24-hour Lucid Dreaming. Charlottesville, VA: Hampton Roads Publishing Company Inc. ISBN 978-1571743596
- Mindell, A. (2000). Quantum Mind: The Edge Between Physics and Psychology. Portland, OR: Lao Tse Press.
- Mindell, A. (1995). Sitting in the Fire: Large Group Transformation Using Conflict and Diversity. Portland, OR: Lao Tse Press. ISBN 978-1887078009
- Mindell, A. (1995). Coma: The Dreambody near Death. Penguin Books (Arkana). ISBN 9780140194838
- Mindell, A. (1993). The Shaman's Body: A New Shamanism for Transforming Health, Relationships, and the Community. HarperSanFrancisco. ISBN 978-0062506559
- Mindell, A. (1992). The Leader as Martial Artist: An Introduction to Deep Democracy (1st ed.). San Francisco: Harper. ISBN 978-0062506405
- Mindell, A. (1990). Working on Yourself Alone: Inner Dreambody Work. Penguin Group. ISBN 9780140192018
- Mindell, A. (1989). The Year 1: Global Process Work -- Community Creation from Global Problems, Tensions and Myths. London: Penguin Books (Arkana). ISBN 978-0140192100
- Mindell, A. (1988). City Shadows: Psychological Interventions in Psychiatry. London and New York: Routledge. ISBN 9780415001939
- Mindell, A. (1985). River's Way: The Process Science of the Dreambody. London: Routledge & Kegan Paul. ISBN 0-7102-0631-3
- Mindell, A. (1982). Dreambody: The Body's Role in Revealing the Self. London: Routledge & Kegan Paul. ISBN 9780710202505
