= Gerda Boyesen =

Norwegian psychologist

- Gerda Boyesen
- Born: May 18, 1922; Bergen, Norway
- Died: December 29, 2005 (aged 83); London, England
- Children: Ebba; Mona Lisa; Paul

Gerda Boyesen (May 18, 1922 – December 29, 2005) was the founder of Biodynamic Psychology, a branch of body psychotherapy.

== Early life and education ==
Gerda Momsen was born in Bergen, Norway, to Richard (a librarian) and Magna (a designer, sportswoman and businesswoman); her grandfather was a schoolteacher and local politician. She was educated in Oslo and was offered a tennis scholarship to the USA, which she did not accept.

In 1943 she married Carl Christian Boyesen and they quickly had three children; they divorced in 1963 and in 1980, Gerda Boyesen married American journalist Walter Danford Smith.

In 1947 she read a book by Wilhelm Reich which made an impression on her. Shortly thereafter she began therapy with Ola Raknes, a vegetotherapist who had been trained by Reich. In 1947 she enrolled at the University of Oslo to study psychology and received training as physiotherapist which led to work with Aadel Bülow-Hansen. Through her own therapy Boyesen got to know the connection between repressed emotions and muscle tensions.

In her book Über den Körper die Seele heilen she established and partly described in a very personal manner how she developed her own therapeutic method linking the beginnings of Wilhelm Reich, Carl Gustav Jung and Sigmund Freud, through her own studies, her own therapeutic experience as well as her own practice.

== Career ==
Boyesen was the founder of "Biodynamic Psychology and Psychotherapy". In 1969 she left for London and opened a practice and later an international teaching and training institute. In addition to client-oriented work other focus areas were included, she was the first woman in Europe to establish her own psychotherapeutic training institute.

Boyesen lived and worked in different, mostly European, countries, however, her work influenced body psychotherapy worldwide. Her books were translated into other languages. She trained psychotherapists over several decades and throughout her life she continued to develop her ideas and methods.

== Work ==
Gerda Boyesen developed, among other things, the theory that the dismantling of psychological stress is also connected with the digestive system. She came to the conclusion that certain massage techniques could bring to completion the expression of unwanted feelings, or "incomplete cycles," and this release of emotional charge would entail similar noises from the intestines as during digestion of food. Boyesen called these noises psychoperistalsis. This process of "digesting" psychological problems is often accompanied by new insights. For this reason she was often called "the lady with the stethoscope" in body psychotherapeutic circles as she used the stethoscope to get a clearer impression of the bowel noises of her clients. She could allegedly differentiate a multiplicity of peristaltic noises, diagnostically arrange and make inferences on the subconscious processes of the clients. To Boyesen it was a good sign when the client's "psychoperistalsis" was in a particular way at the end of a session. That meant it was resolving somewhat and would be able to organize anew without the old restrictive pattern. Also Biodynamic massage is occasionally practiced as a therapy separate to Biodynamic Psychotherapy it is recommended it be tied up to psychotherapy. The psycho-peristalsis can be seen as a non-invasive vagal nerve stimulation.

Apart from the emphasis on gentle unloading through massage she also worked with Wilhelm Reich's vegetotherapy as well as the theories of Jung and Freud, and she continued to develop these into her own method of biodynamic vegetotherapy. In this manner the client is to be encouraged to discover his or her own mental experience (introspective ability), to follow and to express his or her bodily-psychological impulses. Unconscious conflicts would in this way be brought to the surface and to conscious attention and could then be further processed verbally with psychotherapy and finally resolved.

A further element is the Deep Draining, also known as psycho-postural work. It is a special kind of massage aimed at affecting "deeper layers" of the unconscious mind, which is supposed to contribute to attitude changes, physically as well as psychologically. Neurotic patterns would thus be traced, loosened and finally resolved. The claim in Body psychotherapy is that psychological trauma is embedded as a process of body and mind and causes not only mental changes and mental constructions of defense mechanisms, but also physical changes in posture, breathing, movement ability (motility), muscle consistency, changes in the functioning of the autonomic nervous system and other biological processes. These changes are the physical aspect of the mental defense mechanisms. Through psycho-postural work there is a 'removal' of some of the physical elements of the defense mechanisms, a process that allows repressed trauma to emerge into consciousness spontaneously.

The Primary Personality and Secondary Personality are key concepts in Biodynamic psychology that developed by Gerda Boyesen. The Primary Personality is the term used to describe the well-functioning individual, in harmony with the flow of life; self-regulating, and aware of what Gerda Boyesen called ‘universal values’. It has some similar qualities, also it does not define just by it, to what Winnicott called "true self" and Karen Horney called the real self. Secondary Personality is the term for the neurotic structure build-up of armouring in the mind, spirit and in the body. It undermines self-regulation (dysregulated), limiting and distorting perceptions, thoughts, and emotional responses. Gerda Boyesen expanded in her article from 1982 'The primary Personality' and said: "The Primary Personality has what I call an "independent well-being", as opposed to the Secondary Personality which is more neurotic and has no independent well-being but is dependent on others and things outside for satisfaction and gratification. The Secondary Personality is not in touch with his "streamings"." In a further article, The aim of Psychotherapy from 1985 she explained what is independent well-being: ""Independent well-being is a feeling of happiness in yourself, so you don't need other people. You are not desperate for other people in order to be happy. Many relationships are based on dependence. You can’t live without that person or you have to be with that person all the time. You are not happy by yourself."

With Alexander Lowen (Bioenergetics), Boyesen was one of the founders of modern body psychotherapy. Boyesen was an honorary member of the European Association for Body Psychotherapy EABP as well as honorary president of the German Gesellschaft für Biodynamische Psychologie (Society for Biodynamics psychology), the professional association for biodynamics therapists in Germany. Biodynamic Psychology is recognised as a method by the European Association for Psychotherapy EAP. The education of Biodynamics body psychotherapists through the European School for Biodynamics and Erogenetics in Lübeck and through the Ecole Biodynamique in France is recognized by the EABP as a psychotherapist education.

== Criticism ==
Like most body psychotherapeutic schools, Biodynamics is not recognized by the health insurance companies in the United States as a scientifically based therapeutic intervention. However, in Switzerland, Biodynamic Therapy is covered by health care insurance and accepted by the State Secretariat for Education, Research and Innovation and in the UK Biodynamic psychotherapy is part of the United Kingdom Council for Psychotherapy (UKCP), Humanistic and Integrative Psychotherapy College (HIPC).

== Legacy ==
Boyesen's daughters, Ebba and Mona Lisa, also followed a career in biodynamics. In 1993 they founded the European School for Biodynamic Psychology, E.S.B.P.E. e.V. in Lübeck, where they continue their work as directors in 2025.

== Publications ==
- Boyesen, Gerda; Boyesen, Mona Lisa, "Biodynamische Theorie und Praxis", in: Hilarion G. Petzold [Ed.], Die neuen Körpertherapien, 1st ed. Paderborn: Jungfermannsche Verlagsbuchhandlung, 1977, pp. 140–157
- Boyesen, Gerda; Boyesen, Mona Lisa, Biodynamik des Lebens: Die Gerda-Boyesen-Methode – Grundlage der biodynamischen Psychologie, Essen: Synthesis, 1987, 183 p.
- Boyesen, Gerda, Über den Körper die Seele heilen: Biodynamische Psychologie und Psychotherapie, Munich: Kösel, 1994 (7th ed.) ISBN 3-466-34167-1
- Boyesen, Gerda; Leudesdorff, Claudia; Santner, Christoph, Von der Lust am Heilen: Quintessenz meines Lebens, Munich: Kösel, 1995, ISBN 3-466-34323-2
- Boyesen, Gerda, Entre psyché et soma, Payot, 1996 ISBN 2-228-89064-2
- Boyesen, Gerda; Bergholz, Peter, Dein Bauch ist klüger als du, Hamburg, Miko-Edition, 2003 ISBN 3-935436-13-0
- The ‘New’ Collected Papers of Biodynamic Psychology, Massage & Psychotherapy: 2022 A Collection of Articles gathered in Celebration of the 100th Anniversary of Gerda Boyesen's birth Edited by COURTENAY YOUNG ISBN 978-1-908729-23-1 (eBook)
