= Deep democracy =

Group facilitation and decision-making approach

This article focuses primarily on the Mindell-Lewis facilitation tradition. Other uses of the phrase are summarised separately below.

Deep Democracy is a group facilitation, decision-making and conflict resolution approach that seeks to include all voices in a group, particularly those of dissenting or marginal minorities, in the belief that the wisdom needed to make sound and durable decisions often lies in the views that are most easily overlooked. Unlike classical majority democracy, in which a 51% vote is sufficient grounds to act, Deep Democracy holds that a decision is robust only when the perspectives, emotions and concerns of the minority have also been heard and integrated.

The term was coined by the American psychologist Arnold Mindell in his 1992 book The Leader as Martial Artist: An Introduction to Deep Democracy, as part of his work in process-oriented psychology. Mindell developed the concept further with his wife and collaborator Amy Mindell, particularly within "worldwork", their framework for applying process-oriented psychology to large groups, organisations and communities. The concept was subsequently translated into a practical organisational method, now widely known as the Lewis Method of Deep Democracy, by the South African psychologists Myrna Lewis and Greg Lewis during the country's transition out of apartheid.

The phrase "deep democracy" is also used in distinct senses by other thinkers, including the anthropologist Arjun Appadurai and the philosopher Judith M. Green in community development, the economist Haider A. Khan in political economy, and the planner Patricia A. Wilson in civic engagement; these are described briefly below.

== Core ideas ==
Deep Democracy rests on several interlocking principles:

The wisdom of the minority.
A central tenet is that a minority "no" almost always carries information the majority needs. Resistance, dissent and disengagement are read not as obstacles to a decision but as data about what the group as a whole has not yet considered; when that information is excluded, decisions tend to look agreed-upon on the surface but are sabotaged in practice.

Above and below the waterline.
Drawing on its roots in Jungian and process-oriented psychology, Deep Democracy treats every group as having a visible layer (what is said in the meeting) and a much larger invisible layer of unspoken feelings, beliefs, fears and power dynamics. Most facilitation methods work only above this "waterline"; Deep Democracy aims to make it safe enough for what is below to surface.

Inclusion of emotion and experience.
Deep Democracy treats feelings, intuitions and lived experience as legitimate inputs into a decision, alongside argument and analysis, and assumes that conflict, when handled with awareness, is generative rather than destructive. As characterised by Brown and Harris, "deep democracy awareness welcomes inner voices and makes use of diversity and existing tensions to access subjective experience, deeper vision and tangible results of the participants."

Rank and power awareness.
Facilitators in the Mindell tradition are trained to notice differences in formal and informal power—race, gender, seniority, language, culture—and to take active steps so that lower-ranked voices are not silenced by the dynamics of the room.

An attitude as much as a technique.
For the Mindells, Deep Democracy is at root a stance: a "belief in the inherent importance of all parts of ourselves and all viewpoints in the world around us."

The Lewis Method operationalises these ideas into five practical steps that any facilitator can learn: gather all views including those that contradict one's own; actively search for the alternative; spread the "no" by finding who else shares the minority view; add the wisdom of the minority to the majority decision by asking what would be needed for them to come along; and go below the waterline to surface the unspoken tensions that block progress.

== Origins: Arnold and Amy Mindell ==
Arnold Mindell (1940–2024), an American therapist and former physicist trained at MIT and the C. G. Jung Institute in Zürich, developed process-oriented psychology in the 1970s as an extension of Jungian psychology toward body symptoms, altered states and group dynamics. By the early 1990s he had extended it to large-group conflict, applying the same approach to communities, organisations and political "hotspots" such as encounters between Israelis and Palestinians or Serbs and Croats. He set out the concept of Deep Democracy in The Leader as Martial Artist (1992) and developed it further in Sitting in the Fire (1995) and The Deep Democracy of Open Forums (2002).

Amy Mindell, Arnold Mindell's wife and long-standing collaborator, is co-developer of the worldwork framework within which Deep Democracy sits, and has published independently on the concept. The Mindells' framework draws on concepts from relativity and quantum physics to heighten awareness of the relational element in all experience, treating subjective inner experience and observable outer experience as two sides of the same coin.

A widely reported example of Mindell-led worldwork in practice was a 1992 gathering in Oakland, California, in which a racially diverse group of around 200 people came together to explore racial tensions using process-oriented techniques. The San Francisco Chronicle described how participants moved through angry conflict between black and white participants, into the public expression of grief and pain, and ultimately into what the paper described as a collective moment of reconciliation across racial lines.

== Development at Eskom, South Africa ==
The version of Deep Democracy most widely used in organisations today was developed in post-apartheid South Africa. After the 1994 elections, the South African state-owned electricity utility Eskom, like much of the South African public sector, undertook rapid affirmative action restaffing to redress the racial composition of its workforce and management. The result was a deeply shaken organisation: long-serving white staff, newly hired and newly promoted black colleagues, entrenched racial hierarchies, suppressed anger, fear of incompetence and of loss of status, and a culture in which none of this could be openly discussed.

Two clinical psychologists, Myrna Lewis and her late husband Greg Lewis, both students of the Mindells, were brought in to help transform a department that had functioned along hierarchical and racially stratified lines into one in which colleagues could work as equals. They concluded that the problem was too large and too charged to be solved by external consultants doing one-off interventions, and instead distilled the Mindells' process-oriented framework into a small set of accessible tools that could be taught to ordinary managers and staff and used in everyday work conversations.

Over roughly three years they trained approximately a thousand Eskom employees in what became known as the Lewis Method of Deep Democracy. The method's design choices, that it should be pragmatic, fast to learn, and usable by people without any psychology background, were shaped by the realities of that workplace. From Eskom it spread through South African organisations and then internationally; the method has subsequently been studied as a tool for confronting collective trauma in other settings, including Indigenous communities in Canada.

== Main developers ==
Four people are most often named as the principal developers of Deep Democracy as it is practised today:

- Arnold Mindell – originator of the term and of the underlying process-oriented framework.
- Amy Mindell – co-developer of worldwork and of the Mindell tradition of Deep Democracy.
- Myrna Lewis – co-developer of the Lewis Method and its principal teacher today.
- Greg Lewis (deceased) – co-developer of the Lewis Method during the Eskom work and the years that followed.

The Dutch anthropologist and consultant Jitske Kramer is a notable later contributor who has popularised Deep Democracy in European organisational practice. The Canadian planner Aftab Erfan is associated with the first sustained academic studies of the Lewis Method outside South Africa.

== Relation to other methods ==
Deep Democracy sits within a broader family of dialogic and participatory approaches and is often used alongside them. It overlaps with sociocracy and consent-based decision-making in its insistence that objections must be addressed rather than outvoted, but goes further in working explicitly with emotion and the unconscious life of the group. It shares with Nonviolent Communication an attention to feelings and needs underneath positions, but is oriented to group decisions rather than primarily to interpersonal exchange. It is sometimes paired with Theory U, Open Space Technology, World Café and Appreciative Inquiry in facilitation of large groups, where those methods open up conversation and Deep Democracy is used to handle the resistance and conflict that surface. Compared with mediation and conventional conflict resolution, Deep Democracy treats conflict less as a problem to be settled than as a source of information the system needs.

== Other uses of the term ==
The phrase "deep democracy" appears in several other intellectual traditions which are conceptually distinct from the Mindell–Lewis tradition. Arjun Appadurai and the philosopher Judith M. Green use it in the context of community development and grassroots organising; Green describes Deep Democracy as an approach that "would equip people to expect, to understand, and to value diversity and change while preserving and projecting both democratically humane cultural values and interactively sustainable environmental values in a dynamic responsive way." Patricia A. Wilson, a planning theorist, has developed her own variant with a stronger emphasis on inner work and on building the conditions for a culture of dialogue and connectedness, summarising its essence as "the inner experience of interconnectedness." Haider A. Khan, an economist, uses "deep democracy" as a category in political economy and theories of economic justice.

== See also ==
- Process-oriented psychology
- Arnold Mindell
- Sociocracy
- Consensus decision-making
- Theory U
- Conflict resolution
- Nonviolent Communication
