= Process-oriented psychology =

School of psychology founded by Arnold Mindell

Process-oriented psychology, also called process work, is a depth psychology theory and set of techniques developed by Arnold Mindell and associated with transpersonal psychology, somatic psychology and post-Jungian psychology. Process oriented psychology has been applied in contexts including individual therapy and working with groups and organisations. It is known for extending dream analysis to body experiences and for applying psychology to world issues including socioeconomic disparities, diversity issues, social conflict, and leadership.

== Origins and reception ==
Process oriented psychology was originated in the 1970s by Arnold Mindell, an American Jungian analyst then living in Switzerland. It began as a development of Jungian psychology with the concept of a 'dreambody' that extended dream analysis to include work with people's body symptoms and bodily experiences. Jungian analyst June Singer commented that Mindell's work 'expands the scope of Jung's psychology to include not only the psyche but also the body, relationships and the total environment.' Stanislav Grof has described Arnold Mindell as one of the 'pioneers of transpersonal psychology'. Mindell's concepts of 'deep democracy' and 'worldwork' have been identified as part of a toolkit for transformational change which supports collective governance.

In a critical exploration of the relationship between African Americans and C.G. Jung's analytical psychology, Fanny Brewster describes Mindell's dreambody work and his linking of body symptoms and psychological development. Brewster finds that Mindell's development of Jungian ideas is aligned with traditional African concepts of healing which link mind and body:

‘I believe that Mindell’s approach to dreamwork with its emphasis on body healing mirrors the African system of healing’s inclusiveness of body and mind in the process.’

Process Work is recognised within the field of body psychotherapy and somatic psychology with its emphasis on movement and body feeling. Mindell was one of five people honored in 2012 with a Pioneer Award from the US Association of Body Psychotherapy. Following the publication of his book Dreambody in 1982, it reportedly gained a 'worldwide following in the field of holistic healing' although remaining little known in 'traditional psychological circles'.

Process Work is described as an integrative and holistic approach to understanding human behaviours. It is characterized as creative and improvisational: a 'fluid, flexible, playful approach, using some basic principles to improvise effective approaches to whatever comes its way, even-handedly weaving together the personal, political, the bodily, the relational and the spiritual aspects of existence.' It is considered to have similarities with Eugene Gendlin's Focusing and is identified with a focus on the unknown aspects of experience:

'Process Work ... seeks to encounter with the unknown and the irrational side of life. ... [It] appreciates symptoms and disturbances of any sort, not as pathologies to be healed or transcended or somehow got rid of, but as expressions of the very thing we need for our further growth, happiness, or enlightenment.'

From its original 'dreambody' concept, Process Work developed a theory and method of working with altered states of consciousness including near death and coma, and with experiences given psychiatric diagnoses. Mindell's book on coma and palliative care inspired a UK theatre production performed in Edinburgh and London. Process Work and Arnold Mindell are also known for a theory and methods for working with conflict resolution and leadership issues, in groups and organisations.

Process oriented psychology has been associated with alternative spirituality movements. It is considered an example of a modern Western eclectic adaptation of shamanism and has been taught at the Findhorn community in north-east Scotland. Fred Alan Wolf cites Mindell's 'dreambody' concept and the Institute of Noetic Sciences lists Mindell in their directory.

== Theory and practices ==
=== Process ===
The theory of process oriented psychology centres around the idea of 'process': a meaningful, connected pattern over time that can be observed and tracked through non-intentional signals (e.g. non-verbal communication, body symptoms, dreams, accidents, conflicts). It is claimed that becoming consciously aware of the 'dreaming process' may help to deal with disturbances including mental and physical distress, relationship troubles and social issues. The theory of a 'dreaming process' began with Arnold Mindell's concept of the 'dreambody', developed from Jungian dream analysis and the observation that dreams and body symptoms were meaningfully connected. Mindell asserted that a therapist could work with body experiences to reveal the unconscious just as they could work with dreams.

Process Work's contention of a link between dreams and body symptoms is a viewpoint similar to shamanism, 'mankind's oldest medicinal doctrine, where illness reflects one's spiritual condition'. Mindell's theory has also been compared to another Jungian, Meredith Sabini, who similarly recognises a symbolic relationship between dream images and physical symptoms, and values their role in bringing awareness of a person's individuation process, the development of the Jungian Self. Mindell is recognised for providing a method of working psychologically with body symptoms using the technique of 'amplification'; this involves intensifying the experience of a symptom or a dream and following its expression through the various 'channels' of perception until the meaning of the 'dreambody' is revealed to the client.

The idea of a 'dreambody' was generalised to the concept of a 'dreaming process': a potentially meaningful pattern within symptoms, dreams and other irrational or disturbing aspects of our experience. Totton explains that for process oriented psychology, 'dreaming' refers to any 'extra-conscious signals through which our process communicates itself'. The signals of a 'dreaming process' go beyond nighttime dreams and body symptoms to include 'daydreams, imagery and flickers of awareness that come and go'. For Process Work, 'dreaming' can be defined as 'the unconscious activity of the person, both when they are asleep and when they are awake'. Shafton comments that Mindell, along with Walter Bonime, Fritz Perls, Strephon Williams, Jeremy Taylor and Eugene Gendlin, makes the assumption that 'dreamlike symbolic processes occur in waking' and accordingly applies dreamwork techniques to aspects of conscious experience.

The 'dreaming process' is believed to have a meaningful, purposeful direction of change, reflecting the influence of Taoism and Jungian psychology. The dreaming process can be understood as the Jungian unconscious 'seeking integration, and ... creating opportunities for the individual to grow in conscious awareness'.

An important conceptual distinction for process oriented psychology is between the 'primary' (intended) and the 'secondary' (unintended) aspects of a given behaviour or experience:

people at any given moment experienc[e] a 'primary process' — aspects of our experience with which we identify — and a 'secondary process' — aspects with which we find it hard to identify and which are trying insistently to enter our awareness.

For an individual, the primary or intended aspects of communication and behaviour will be shaped by conscious norms and values, while secondary processes will include disturbing, challenging or irrational experiences that are further from awareness and often overtly marginalised. Process Work aims to integrate secondary processes into a person's primary, conscious awareness to reduce the disturbance and access its potential for meaning and growth.

Process Work theory includes a framework of experiential 'channels' through which the dreaming process is expressed; these channels include the visual, auditory, movement (kinaesthetic), body feeling (proprioceptive), relationship and world channels. Like Gestalt therapy, Process Work tracks a person's experience as it shifts between different channels. Process Work is particularly known for using the channels of body awareness, movement and physical contact to explore psychological issues. The concept of a purposeful 'dreaming process' expressing itself through multiple 'channels' of experience is the theoretical basis for Process Work's 'far-reaching and flexible approach, which uses essentially the same capacious toolbox to work with everything from bodily symptoms to couple relationships to political conflicts'.

The theory and contentions of process oriented psychology have been described as an alternative to mainstream psychology. Process Work proposes that disturbing feelings, symptoms and behaviours be interpreted as 'an underlying urge toward health, wholeness, and diversity rather than pathology'. The theory suggests understanding the meaning of symptoms and disturbances rather than only focusing on modifying or eliminating them.

=== Worldwork and deep democracy ===
The application of process oriented psychology to group issues is called 'worldwork', which includes theory and practices for working with conflict, leadership and social issues. A key concept is 'deep democracy', Mindell's stance that all viewpoints, including emotional and irrational ones, matter to a group's decisions. Deep democracy has since been developed into a distinct facilitation approach.

Process Work applications for groups have become known through Mindell's books: The Leader as Martial Artist: An Introduction to Deep Democracy (1992) and Sitting in the Fire: Large Group Transformation Using Conflict and Diversity (1995). Mindell's ideas of worldwork and deep democracy have been likened to the work of Danaan Parry.

Worldwork includes group techniques for developing awareness of social issues like racism and has been used to deal with post-conflict trauma. Worldwork has been described as the 'attempt to apply psychotherapy in the sphere of political conflict without privileging the therapeutic over the political', because it takes on the challenge of supporting all sides of a conflict while dealing with the real politics of inequality. Totton notes that 'so far worldwork has not resolved this problem, perhaps it cannot be resolved, but only held in continual tension'. Similarly, worldwork has been described as 'group therapy in public': a group work technique aiming to bring awareness to 'the hidden emotional undercurrents surrounding social issues, like racism, that are rarely addressed publicly'. Totton comments that worldwork is 'difficult: experimental, stirring, demanding every ounce of flexibility and awareness from all the participants ... but also tremendously hopeful'.

An often-cited example of worldwork was a 1992 gathering in Oakland, California, where a racially diverse group of around 200 people used Process Work techniques to work through racial tensions in a public forum.

The Process Work approach to leadership and conflict facilitation is based on the idea of deep democracy; it tries to build awareness of the bigger picture and develop compassion for all sides in a conflict, an approach that Mindell refers to as 'eldership'. Process oriented psychology is known for a positive model of conflict, seeing it as an opportunity for growth and community; Mindell, like the authors Thomas Crum and Danaan Parry, suggests that dealing with personal conflicts better can create global change. The model of conflict resolution involves identifying the sides in the conflict as roles and having the conflicting parties experiment with expressing all roles, swapping sides until greater understanding is achieved. Conflict is understood as a sign that at least one viewpoint or experience within the group is not being adequately represented and Process Work aims to bring these 'ghosts' into conscious awareness and dialogue.

== Research ==
Process oriented psychology is one of eleven psychotherapeutic modalities examined in a Swiss longitudinal study of therapeutic effectiveness completed in 2012. There are published studies of the clinical application of Process Work to group therapy with people experiencing mental illness and to the care of elders with dementia. A Japanese case study has described the application of process oriented psychology to the treatment of a woman with symptoms including major depression and an eating disorder, concluding that the method can be effective in the resolution of psychosomatic problems.

Process Work has been used to extend play therapy techniques and found to enrich therapeutic work with children experiencing parental separation issues. The process oriented psychology approach to clinical supervision has been documented and shown to offer experiential and phenomenological techniques to work with signals, roles and the "parallel dynamics" that occur within client-counsellor and counsellor-supervisor interactions. It has been suggested that the concept of ‘metaskills’ can be useful for the psychotherapist seeking to serve polyamorous clients. Connections have been established between process oriented psychology and dance movement therapy.

The concept of ‘rank’ as defined and developed by Mindell has been taken up in a number of contexts including action learning, the analysis of international nongovernmental organization advocacy campaigns, and anti-racism diversity work. An Australian case study has considered the use of process oriented psychology for tackling the problems of intercultural communication in higher education; it finds that Process Work has a multidimensional concept of social rank (expanded beyond social status to include 'psychological' and 'spiritual' aspects) which promotes understanding of interpersonal communication issues and could be used to improve international student experience in Australia.

== Organisations ==
Process oriented psychology is represented by a professional organisation called the International Association of Practitioners of Process Oriented Psychology (IAPOP). The Association recognises over 25 training centres around the world including the UK, Australia & New Zealand, Poland, Switzerland, Slovakia, Ireland, Japan, India, Greece, Israel, Palestine, Russia, Ukraine and the US. The first teaching organisation was founded in Zürich in 1982 and is now known as the Institute for Process Work (Institut für Prozessarbeit IPA), an accredited Training Institute for psychotherapy in Switzerland. The Research Society for Process Oriented Psychology in the UK (RSPOPUK)'s Training Programme is accredited by the United Kingdom Council of Psychotherapy, within the Humanistic and Integrative Psychotherapy Section. In the US, the first training centre was established in 1989 in Portland, Oregon, now known as the Process Work Institute, while the Deep Democracy Institute was founded in 2006. The newest Institute for Processwork was founded 2018 in Germany (Institut für Prozessarbeit Deutschland).

== Criticism and early controversy ==
Criticisms of process oriented psychology include that the 'dreambody' concept and techniques are too subjective and overly positive. Mindell's concept of the meaningful 'dreambody' has been criticised for coming 'perilously close' to psychologising every illness; Shafton values 'dreambody work' but cautions that body symptoms are ambiguous and may be a product of stress or denial as much as a message for growth. Others have claimed that Process Work as a therapy is hard to define and has similarities with 'faith healing', raising hopes about the healing of physical illness (though it is reported that Mindell explicitly discourages this idea). Like other transpersonal psychologies, process oriented psychology has been identified by critics as a method having 'a mystical or supernaturalistic application, theory, significance, or pedigree.' In 1997, a Japanese scientist involved in deprogramming members of the Aum Shinrikyo cult mentioned process oriented psychology as an example of recent psychotherapeutic paradigms that draw on Asian philosophy, Gestalt, Jung and transpersonal psychology, and claimed that, while 'these programs are not substantively dangerous', the methods may be used adversely and have the potential to be a form of 'mind control'. He then clarified that process oriented psychology was not amongst those that were dangerous. Mindell's (1993) book, Leader as Martial Artist, has been critiqued as a use of Eastern belief systems to justify capitalist business practice.

There has been controversy in the history of process oriented psychology in the US state of Oregon. In 1990, a Eugene newspaper, the Register-Guard, reported that a planning permit application for the coastal town of Yachats by the founder, Arnold Mindell, was met with initial apprehension and fears of 'another Bhagwan Shree Rajneesh' although these fears were subsequently allayed. Twenty-three years later, in 2013, The Yachats Academy of Arts and Sciences invited Arnold and his wife Amy Mindell to offer a keynote lecture on their work on conflict resolution around the world.

In 2001, a Portland alternative newspaper, the Willamette Week guided by the complaint of a student, reported that an Oregon school of process oriented psychology, (one of 26 worldwide schools of process oriented psychology), the Process Work Center of Portland (now known as the Process Work Institute) was being investigated by the Oregon Office of Degree Authorization (ODA) due to a complaint by a student and an anonymous letter with the primary complaint that teachers in the Masters in Process Work shared student information inappropriately, and that relationship and sexual boundaries were not clear between students.' Some allegations were not verified while others were "substantially correct". ODA recommended improvements in privacy policies and dual relationship policies between students and faculty. PWI complied with changes requested during the investigation and the degree remained continuously authorized by the state of Oregon degree authorization office. The Process Work Institute does not have regional accreditation and does not participate in DOE Title IV lending. Small schools in the Pacific NW are not eligible for regional accreditation unless they have 300 or more active students. PWI is currently pursuing national accreditation which is allowed in the US for smaller schools. Other schools of Process Work internationally such as in Switzerland, Poland, the UK, and Australia have been able to become accredited either regionally, nationally, or by psychological professional accrediting boards. The ODA website shows that in 2014 the Process Work Institute is authorised as a degree offering institution and lists PWI as one of the unaccredited private colleges approved for students in Oregon.

== See also ==
- Body psychotherapy
- Deep democracy
- Depth psychology
- Somatic psychology
- Transpersonal psychology
- (Whiteheadian) Process psychology
