= Aadel Bülow-Hansen =

Norwegian physiotherapist

- Born: September 24, 1906; Kristiania (now Oslo), Norway
- Died: November 18, 2001 (aged 95)
- Known for: Development of psychomotor physiotherapy
- Relatives: Victor Bülow-Hansen (father)
- Medical career
- Profession: Physiotherapy
- Field: Psychomotor physiotherapy
- Institutions: Orthopedic and Medico-Mechanical Institute; Sophie's Mind Clinic (now Oslo University Hospital)
- Awards: Royal Norwegian Order of St. Olav (First Class)

Aadel Bülow-Hansen (24 September 1906 – 18 November 2001) was a Norwegian physiotherapist. Together with the psychiatrist Trygve Braatøy (1904–1953), she developed psychomotor physiotherapy using psychomotorics, which can be used for the treatment of neuromuscular stress conditions.

Aadel Bülow-Hansen was born in Kristiania (now Oslo), Norway. She went to primary and middle school at Nissens Pigeskole. She continued her education at the Orthopedic and Medico-Mechanical Institute (Christiania Orthopediske and Medico Mekaniske Senter), which had been founded by her father, Victor Bülow-Hansen (1861–1938).

She was employed by Sophie's Mind Clinic (now a subsidiary of Oslo University Hospital) from 1927 until 1945. During World War II, she worked together with the neurologist Henrik Seyffarth to find treatments for work-related stress. She came to understand that there might be a connection between muscle tension, respiration, and mental trauma. Bülow-Hansen saw how important controlled respiration was to contributing to a healthy body, and that it can also lead to control of the emotions.

She was the first physiotherapist to be named to the First Class of the Royal Norwegian Order of St. Olav, and in 2000, she was named as the physiotherapist of the century in Norway.

One of her students was Gerda Boyesen, who later developed Biodynamic Psychology, a form of body psychotherapy.
