= Waking the Tiger =

1997 book by Peter A. Levine

- First edition cover of Waking the Tiger
- Authors: Peter A. Levine; Ann Frederick
- Language: English
- Genre: Counseling psychology
- Publisher: North Atlantic Books
- Publication date: July 7, 1997
- Publication place: United States
- Media type: Print (Paperback)
- Pages: 274
- ISBN: 978-1-55643-233-0
- OCLC: 36201037
- LC Class: RC552.P67L48 1997

Waking the Tiger: Healing Trauma is a self-help book by American therapist Peter A. Levine and Ann Frederick published in 1997. It presents a somatic experiencing approach which it says helps people who are struggling with psychological trauma. The book discusses inhibition and releasing a form of "energy".

== Synopsis ==
Waking the Tiger contains four sections: Section I: The Body as Healer; Section II: Symptoms of Trauma; Section III: Transformation and Renegotiation; and Section IV: First Aid for Trauma. Peter Levine argues in the book that it is through action instead of talking that people can assist others who are struggling with psychological trauma. He presents the somatic experiencing approach.

Peter A. Levine received a doctorate in medical biophysics from the University of California, Berkeley and has an independent psychology doctorate. In 1969 Levine encountered a graduate student, Nancy, who experienced brutalizing panic attacks, unexplainable in her view. Levine started their discussion with a typical relaxation technique. While Nancy was silently paying attention in her seat, she failed to react. When he continued attempting to get her to relax, she unexpectedly had a massive panic attack. Levine says he became immersed in her panic attack. In his mind, he suddenly saw a tiger stopped low and preparing to jump at them. Immersed in the nightmare, he ordered, "Nancy! You are being attacked by a large tiger! See the tiger as it comes toward you! Run toward that tree! Run, Nancy, run! Climb up! Escape!"

Levine said Nancy's legs began moving as if she was sprinting. Nancy said that, for her first time, she had remembered a scary childhood experience. When she was three years old she experienced a tonsillectomy during which she was secured to an operating table to prevent movement. The anesthesia could have been only partially working which caused her to feel like she was being strangled. Her experience was drilled into her and could not just be remembered while she was alert. While counseling Nancy, Levine at the time also was researching predation, which Sandra Blakeslee and Matthew Blakeslee noted could be the reason Levine pictured a tiger. Experts generally have not found evidence to support Levine's findings; he found that for prey that have completely lost the ability to move, "the sudden immobility of a highly charged nervous system compresses energy that is then 'stored' in the nervous system if not released".

When prey are able to avoid predators, however, prey will sprint away and "literally shake off the residual effects of the immobility response" while "their bodies convulse with paroxysmal spasms". There is no evidence for Levine's conclusions about the prey's responses or Nancy's response to their session. Observing Nancy, Levine concluded that her convulsions were an "instinctive and long-overdue response" to her being strapped down and scared when a child. He concluded without evidence that Nancy's panic attacks were caused by the "frozen residue of 'energy'" that remained stuck in her, not from the traumatic experience. Levine argues that humans cannot effortlessly release energy from a traumatic memory because human's triune brain structure which, shaped by feelings and acumen, frequently supersedes instinct. He said that Nancy stopped experiencing panic attacks after she had additional sessions with him that involved more convulsions".

== Reception ==
Ruth P. Newton, a professor at the University of California, San Diego, wrote a mixed review of the book in the journal Psychosomatic Medicine. She found the case materials to be "interesting" because readers can observe how Levine "uses his theory to guide his clinical work". But Newton found that "the theory and case material are entangled by a self-help format that weakens his presentation and jeopardizes the overall organization of the book". She concluded that "the book is more appropriately used by professionals rather than directly by patients or clients". Newton strongly criticized the book's self-help therapy activities that improperly claim to help readers to overcome their frightening experiences, writing, "I shudder to imagine a patient or client who is drawn to self-help books that will heal secret traumas alone in his or her living room with an exercise that asks them to ' pretend you are in an airplane flying at 30,000 feet… [when] you suddenly hear a loud explosion…followed by complete silence'."

John Marzillier for British Psychological Society wrote that "The psychologist Peter Levine is a major figure in the trauma field. His earlier book, Waking the Tiger: Healing Trauma (North Atlantic Books, 1997), aimed at a general readership, was very successful." Marzillier found that in Waking the Tiger, the "notion of 'energy' was relatively undeveloped, a weakness in his model". In Psychology Today, Cheryl Eckl called Waking the Tiger a "seminal book" in which Levine tells readers "we can learn much about trauma from observing animals in the wild".
