= Biodynamics =

Biodynamics may refer to:

- Biodynamic agriculture, a method of farming based on the teachings of Rudolf Steiner
  - The Biodynamic Association, a United States–based company that promotes the Biodynamic agriculture system
  - Biodynamic wine, wines made by employing the biodynamic methods
- Biodynamic massage, a complementary therapy developed by Gerda Boyesen in Norway during the 1950s
