= Triune brain =

Model of evolutionary neurology proposed by Paul McLean

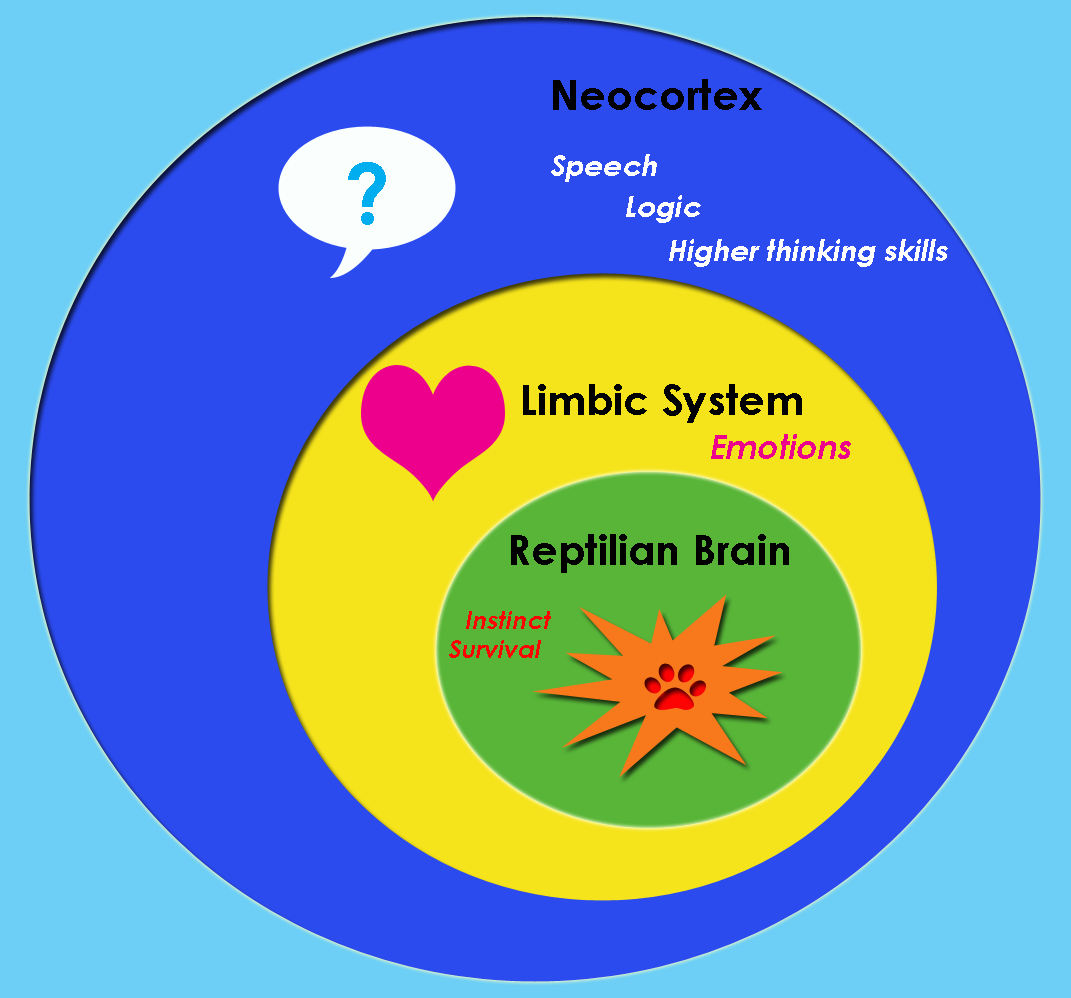
Model of MacLean's Triune Brain hypothesis

The triune brain (Note: /ˈtraɪjuːn, ˌtraɪˈjuːn/ TRY-yoon or try-YOON) was a once popular model of the evolution of the vertebrate forebrain and behavior, proposed by the American physician and neuroscientist Paul D. MacLean in the 1960s. The triune brain consists of the reptilian complex (basal ganglia), the paleomammalian complex (limbic system), and the neomammalian complex (neocortex), viewed each as independently conscious, and as structures sequentially added to the forebrain in the course of evolution. According to the model, the basal ganglia are in charge of primal instincts, the limbic system is in charge of emotions, and the neocortex is responsible for objective or rational thoughts.

Since the 1970s, the concept of the triune brain has been subject to criticism in evolutionary and developmental neuroscience and is now regarded as a myth. Although it overlaps in some respects with contemporary understanding of the brain, the triune brain hypothesis was largely abandoned by comparative neuroscientists at the turn of the 21st century.

MacLean originally formulated his model in the 1960s and propounded it at length in his 1990 book The Triune Brain in Evolution. The triune brain hypothesis became familiar to a broad popular audience through Carl Sagan's Pulitzer Prize winning 1977 book The Dragons of Eden.

== Aspects ==
=== Reptilian complex ===
"Reptilian complex" (also known as the "R-complex", "reptilian brain" or "lizard brain") was the name MacLean gave to the basal ganglia, structures derived from the floor of the forebrain during development. The term derives from the idea that comparative neuroanatomists once believed that the forebrains of reptiles and birds were dominated by these structures. MacLean proposed that the reptilian complex was responsible for species-typical instinctual behaviours involved in aggression, dominance, territoriality, and ritual displays.

=== Paleomammalian complex ===
This consists of the septum, amygdalae, hypothalamus, hippocampal complex, and cingulate cortex. MacLean first introduced the term "limbic system" to refer to this set of interconnected brain structures in a paper in 1952. MacLean's recognition of the limbic system as a major functional system in the brain was widely accepted among neuroscientists and is generally regarded as his most important contribution to the field. MacLean maintained that the structures of the limbic system arose early in mammalian evolution (hence "paleomammalian", with paleo- meaning old) and were responsible for the motivation and emotion involved in feeding, reproductive behaviour, and parental behaviour.

=== Neomammalian complex ===
This consists of the cerebral neocortex, a structure found uniquely in higher mammals, and especially humans. MacLean regarded its addition as the most recent step in the evolution of the mammalian brain, conferring the ability for language, abstraction, planning, and perception.

== Interactions between structures ==
The triune brain model argues that these structures are relatively independent from one another, but that they are still connected to each other in some form or another.

The model views different cognitive behaviors as caused by three different entities instead of one. The reptilian complex is said to control all of the instinctual and impulsive actions, while the neomammalian complex is responsible for keeping the primitive instincts constrained. An example is controlling the impulse to eat. It seems that if one is hungry, then that means the reptilian complex is commanding the body to eat. However, an individual has the rational choice not to eat when hungry, and this rational thought is said to be controlled by the neomammalian complex. The model thus suggests that these two (and three, depending on the situation) structures are in a perpetual battle to control the body.

These interactions between the neocortex and the reptilian brain often seem competitive, as the conscious thought generated by the neocortex can suppress the primitive thoughts generated by the reptilian complex. Thus, the model suggests that the interactions between structures are not constructive, but that they are conflicting due to the anatomical separation of the brain.

This separation of structures proposed an underlying difference between consciousness and unconscious behaviour and argued that the reason why humans are such an intelligent and conscious species is due to the not-so-common neocortex that they possess, unlike most other animals. This detachment contributes to the idea that the three complexes interact with each other separately rather than as a single construct interacting with itself.

== Status of the model ==
MacLean originally formulated the triune brain hypothesis in the 1960s, drawing on comparative neuroanatomical work done by Ludwig Edinger, Elizabeth C. Crosby, and Charles Judson Herrick early in the twentieth century. The 1980s saw a rebirth of interest in comparative neuroanatomy, motivated in part by the availability of a variety of new neuroanatomical techniques for charting the circuitry of animal brains. Subsequent findings, according to human brain evolution expert Terrence Deacon, have refined the traditional neuroanatomical ideas upon which MacLean based his hypothesis. Deacon mentioned that 'the evolutionary addition of different parts of the brain is simply not realistic. However, all the parts of the brain were already existing; they were just further developed upon as the homosapien species evolved and gained life experiences.'

For example, the basal ganglia (structures derived from the floor of the forebrain and making up MacLean's reptilian complex) were shown to take up a much smaller portion of the forebrains of reptiles and birds (together called sauropsids) than previously supposed, and to exist in amphibians and fish as well as mammals and sauropsids. Because the basal ganglia are found in the forebrains of all modern vertebrates, they most likely date to the common evolutionary ancestor of the vertebrates, more than 500 million years ago, rather than to the origin of reptiles.

Recent behavioral studies do not support the traditional view of sauropsid behavior as stereotyped and ritualistic (as in MacLean's reptilian complex). Birds have been shown to possess highly sophisticated cognitive abilities, such as the toolmaking of the New Caledonian crow and the language-like categorization abilities of the grey parrot. Structures of the limbic system, which MacLean proposed arose in early mammals, have now been shown to exist across a range of modern vertebrates. The "paleomammalian" trait of parental care of offspring is widespread in birds and occurs in some fishes as well. Thus, like the basal ganglia, the evolution of these systems presumably dates to a common vertebrate ancestor.

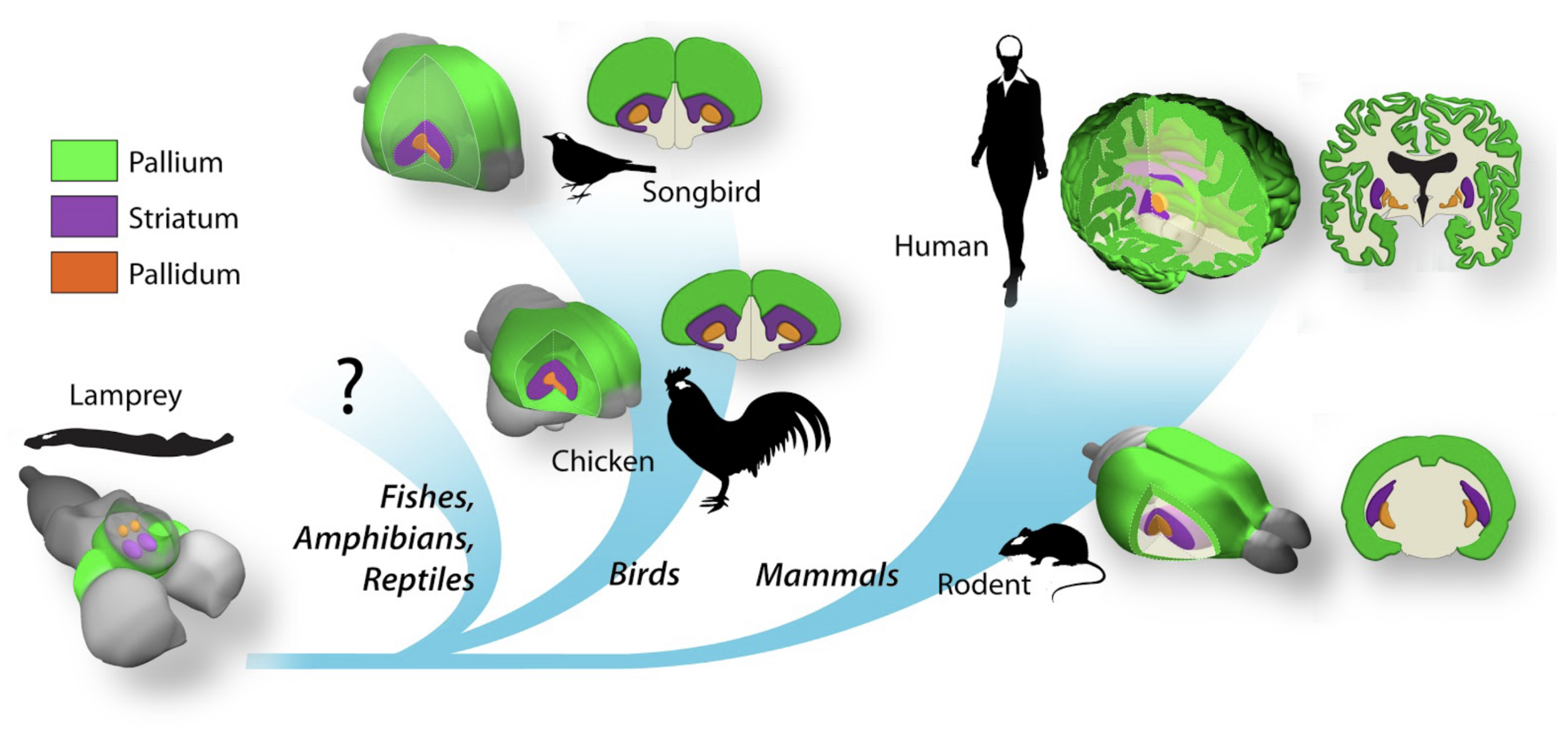
The ratio of the brain mass devoted to the pallium increase in parallel in various vertebrates' taxa

Finally, recent studies based on paleontological data or comparative anatomical evidence strongly suggest that the neocortex was already present in the earliest emerging mammals. In addition, although non-mammals do not have a neocortex in the true sense (that is, a structure comprising part of the forebrain roof, or pallium, consisting of six characteristic layers of neurons), they possess pallial regions, and some parts of the pallium are considered homologous to the mammalian neocortex. While these areas lack the characteristic six neocortical layers, birds and reptiles generally possess three layers in the dorsal pallium (the homolog of the mammalian neocortex). The telencephalon of birds and mammals makes neuroanatomical connections with other telecencephalic structures like those made by neocortex. It mediates similar functions such as perception, learning and memory, decision making, motor control, conceptual thinking.

== Lay interest ==
The triune model of the mammalian brain is seen as an oversimplified organizing theme in the field of comparative neuroscience. It continues to hold public interest because of its simplicity.

Howard Bloom, in his 1995 book The Lucifer Principle, references the concept of the triune brain in his explanations of certain aspects of human behavior. Arthur Koestler made MacLean's concept of the triune brain the centerpiece of much of his later work, notably The Ghost in the Machine. English novelist Julian Barnes quotes MacLean on the triune brain in the foreword to his 1982 novel Before She Met Me. Peter A. Levine uses the triune brain concept in his book Waking the Tiger to explain his somatic experiencing approach to healing trauma. In the series of novels written by Lee Child featuring knight-errant figure Jack Reacher, Reacher often experiences messages from what he calls his "lizard brain" that alert him to potential danger. In Disco Elysium, the player character interfaces directly with his limbic system and "ancient reptilian brain" at various points throughout the game, alongside the player's skill set acting as a representation of his posterior neocortex.

Glynda-Lee Hoffmann, in her book The Secret Dowry of Eve, Women's Role in the Development of Consciousness, references the triune theory explored by MacLean and goes one step further. Her theory about human behavior, and the problems we create with that behavior, distinguishes the prefrontal cortex as uniquely different from the rest of the neocortex. The prefrontal cortex, with its agenda of integration, is the part of the brain that can get the other parts to work together for the good of the individual. Hoffmann claims that in many humans the reptilian cortex (agenda: territory and reproduction; in humans that translates to power and sex) is out of control, and the amygdala stokes the fear that leads to more bad behavior.
