= Biodynamic massage =

Biodynamic massage is a complementary therapy developed by Gerda Boyesen in Norway during the 1950s.

== History ==
"During a massage, if I see any sign of movement trying to emerge in the client, I would always try to encourage it, because my conviction is that this is going to liberate and express much more energy than would result from what I'm going to do with my hands."

— Think Through the Body - Roz Carroll

In 1969, Boyesen set up the Gerda Boyesen Training School at Acacia House in Acton Park. It is both a psychological and energetic therapy which is concerned with the integration of all aspects of an individual. This includes the physical, emotional, mental and spiritual aspects of existence. A key concept in biodynamic massage is the belief in a universal life force that connects all of us.

Biodynamic massage is used on its own, as part of body psychotherapy or to support psychotherapy of a different modality. The touch does not attempt to cure, but rather bring the client into relationship with their body.

== Biodynamic massage techniques ==
There are a wide variety of techniques that focuses on skin, bone, muscular, fascia, energy and aura.

== Theory ==
According to Biodynamic massage, the digestive tract has a dual function. It is to digest physical nourishment, but also the emotional digestion of stressful situations. Once away from the stressful situation, the experience can be digested in our guts when rest is possible. Biodynamic therapists use a stethoscope during the massage to listen to the peristalsis and use it as feedback to guide the massage.
