= Elias Porter =

American psychologist

- Born: 1914; Oregon, U.S.
- Died: December 13, 1987 (aged 73); Pacific Palisades, California, U.S.
- Education: University of Oregon; Ohio State University
- Known for: Relationship awareness theory, contributions to Rogerian psychology (e.g., client-centered therapy), systems and human factors training
- Scientific career
- Fields: Psychology
- Workplaces: University of Oregon; University of Chicago; University of California, Los Angeles; University of California, San Diego

Elias Hull Porter (1914 – December 13, 1987) was an American psychologist. While at the University of Chicago Porter was a peer of other notable American psychologists, including Carl Rogers, Thomas Gordon, Abraham Maslow and Will Schutz. His work at Ohio State University and later at the University of Chicago contributed to Rogers’ development of client-centered therapy. Porter's primary contributions to the field of psychology were in the areas of non-directive approaches, relationship awareness theory and psychometric tests. His career included military, government, business and clinical settings.

== Education and early influences ==
In the mid-1930s, Porter was a student of Calvin S. Hall (who had just completed doctoral studies with Edward C. Tolman at University of California, Berkeley) and Robert W. Leeper (who was heavily influence by Kurt Lewin). He completed his masters work in 1938 at the University of Oregon, which documented that learning occurs in rats in mazes, even without the presence of rewards, and that the learning could be accessed later in the presence of rewards. In 1941, he completed his doctoral work at the Ohio State University where he was a student and assistant professor of psychology under Carl Rogers. His dissertation was the first of many studies to empirically document the effectiveness of the non-directive approach in counseling.

== Career highlights ==
In the late 1930s Porter was employed as the merit system supervisor for the Oregon State Public Welfare Commission and during World War II served as a classification officer in the United States Navy. Following WWII, he returned to academia and his association with Carl Rogers by joining the faculty of the University of Chicago's Counseling Center. In the mid-1950s to mid-1960s, he was employed as the assistant director of human factors directorate, System Development Corporation (an affiliation of the RAND Corporation) and senior system scientist, Technomics, Inc. In the late 1960s, he maintained independent practice, several university connections and was an author for Atkins-Katcher Associates. In 1971, he founded Personal Strengths Publishing, serving as its president, and he continued various university connections.

== Significant work and contributions ==
=== Rogerian theory and practice ===
Porter's work with Rogers and others including Tom Gordon and Arthur Shedlin at the University of Chicago's Counseling Center resulted in Rogers' student-centered learning model. The group designed training programs for counselors employed at the United States Veteran Administration, teaching them to use non-directive (client-centered) techniques. During this time he wrote An Introduction to Therapeutic Counseling, which highlighted the “importance of the counselor’s attitudes” in therapy and gave counselors guidance about structuring and conducting therapeutic sessions. Rogers, in his foreword to Porter's book, wrote, “I was among the doubters when the author conceived this book. I felt that problems considered on paper could do little to help counselors to recognize and deal with their basic attitudes…He has succeeded where to me failure seemed almost certain…It is hoped that it will have wide influence in stimulating constructive thinking about significant issues and problems in the growing field of psychotherapy.” Porter referenced the “in development” manuscript of Rogers’ landmark 1951 book Client-Centered Therapy and contributed to its development as evidenced by Rogers’ several references to Porter.

=== Systems theory and human factors ===
Porter's involvement with the RAND Corporation yielded two noteworthy publications, an essay entitled "The Parable of the Spindle," and his 1964 book Manpower Development. Manpower Development was one of the first published works to view organizational systems as complete organisms. In these works, the purposive nature of human behavior was studied in the context of organizational systems and human factors.

=== Psychometric testing and evaluation ===
Porter's earliest known psychometric evaluations were performed with Rogers, and they measured the degree of directiveness or non-directiveness of a counselor using client-centered techniques. The Person-Relatedness Test measured and validated Erich Fromm's four non-productive orientations. In 1967 he restructured the Person Relatedness Test and published it as LIFO. In 1971, Porter abandoned LIFO and published the Strength Deployment Inventory, which modified Fromm's ideas and incorporated Porter's original concepts. In the early 1970s he introduced the Feedback Edition of the Strength Deployment Inventory and the Interpersonal Requirements Inventory (since retitled Expectations Edition of the Strength Deployment Inventory).

== Relationship awareness theory ==
Relationship awareness theory blended unique forms of psychological thought. The theory recognizes the behaviorist ideas of Edward Tolman, the empiricism of Kurt Lewin, Rogerian client-centered therapy and personality theories of Neo-Freudians Erich Fromm and Karen Horney. The theory itself is founded on four premises:

=== Behavior is driven by motivation ===
Porter drew from Tolman's concept that “Behavior traits arise from purposive striving for gratification, mediated by concepts or hypotheses about how to obtain those gratifications.” When combined with his research into Fromm's non-productive orientations and his frame of reference from University of Chicago peers Rogers and Maslow, Porter concluded that the primary motive all people share is a desire to feel worthwhile about themselves – and that each person is motivated to achieve feelings of self-worth in different ways. Those different ways were first expressed by Sigmund Freud as psychic energy being stuck or fixed at various stages of the infant's relationship with the mother. They were then modified by Fromm and expressed as non-productive orientations of adults in society. Porter took Fromm's Freudian frame of reference and modified it based on the principle that the primary drive is for self-worth, or self-actualization. Hence, relationship awareness theory highlights seven distinct motivational value systems (which can be traced through Freud and Fromm) and describes them in terms of positive strivings for self-worth by adults in relationships. Porter was the first known psychometrician to use colors (red, green and blue) as shortcuts to communicate the results of a personality test.

=== Motivation changes in conflict ===
This premise is Porter's work and perhaps his most significant contribution to the field of psychology. Based on his observations with clients and ongoing research into the results of his own psychometrics, he stated, “When we are free to pursue our gratifications, we are more or less uniformly predictable, but in the face of continuing conflict or opposition we undergo changes in motivations that link into different bodies of beliefs and concepts that are, in turn, expressed in yet different behavior traits.” Porter's description of the conflict sequence suggests that people experience changes in their motivation predictably and sequentially in up to three stages. The first stage characterized by a concern for one's self, the problem and the other person; the second by a concern for one's self and the problem and the third by a concern only for the self. The theory further states that the universal productive motive of behavior in conflict is to preserve personal integrity and self-worth.

=== Personal weaknesses are overdone strengths ===
Porter accepted Fromm's premise that strengths taken to excess become weaknesses. While Fromm's work focused on describing the four non-productive orientations and advocating a fifth “productive orientation”, Porter combined Fromm's ideas with the first premise (striving for self-worth) and concluded that what Fromm described as non-productive behavior was in fact ineffective behavior being driven by positive motivation.

=== Clarity and face validity enhance self-discovery ===
Porter stated that “The more clearly the concepts in a personality theory approximate how one experiences oneself, the more effectively they serve as devices for self-discovery.” This premise is consistent with Rogerian or person-centered approaches; it further connects with Rogerian thought by suggesting that the use of the theory should have congruence. Just as Rogers suggests that a person should have congruence between, their experience, awareness, and communication, Porter suggests that a psychometric test should communicate to the user in such a way that it heightens the awareness of the life-experience of the test-taker and becomes useful to the test-taker regarding making behavioral choices. Consistent with Porter's other significant works, the emphasis was placed on practical application in relationships, not on diagnostic or predictive capabilities. The Strength Deployment Inventory, Porter's psychometric test based on relationship awareness theory, provides the test-taker with a description of motivation and related behavior set in the context of relationships under two conditions: when things are going well and when faced with conflict. The theory claims that one of the primary causes of conflict is the overdoing or perceived overdoing of strengths in relationships; because people experience these overdone strengths as potential threats to self-worth. He suggested that personal filters influence perception; that people tend to use their own motivational values as a standard when evaluating the behavior of others and that the more different two people's motivational values are from each other, the more likely they would each be to perceive the behaviors of the others as overdone.

== Entrepreneurship ==
Porter, with his wife Sara Maloney Porter, DSW, established Personal Strengths Assessment Service in 1971 to promote his relationship awareness theory and related training programs. He renamed it Personal Strengths Publishing and acted as president of the organization until his death in 1987 from oral cancer. During that time he expanded the company internationally and wrote numerous training programs, manuals and articles. He created and attempted to market several other commercial products including a stop smoking program and a residential real-estate purchasing decision system, none of which achieved commercial success. Sara Maloney Porter continued to manage the business until her retirement in 1995. Personal Strengths Publishing is currently headquartered in Carlsbad, California and has offices in 12 other countries.

== Selected works ==
- Porter, E.H. (1950) An Introduction to Therapeutic Counseling. Boston: Houghton Mifflin
- Porter, E.H. (1962) Parable of the Spindle. Harvard Business Review, 40, 58-66
- Porter, E.H. (1964) Manpower Development. New York: Harper & Row.
- Porter, E.H. (1971, 1996) Strength Deployment Inventory. Carlsbad, CA: Personal Strengths Publishing, Inc.
- Porter, E.H. (1973, 1996) Relationship Awareness Theory, Manual of Administration and Interpretation, Ninth Edition. Carlsbad, CA: Personal Strengths Publishing, Inc.

== See also ==
- Human factors and ergonomics
- Person-centered psychotherapy
