= Polyvagal theory =

Proposed constructs pertaining to the vagus nerve

The vagus nerve

Polyvagal theory (PVT) is a collection of proposed evolutionary, neuroscientific, and psychological constructs pertaining to the role of the vagus nerve in emotion regulation, social connection, and fear responses. The theory was introduced in 1994 by Stephen Porges. PVT is popular among some clinical practitioners and patients. However, multiple aspects of the theory are widely criticized for being at odds with known science. For example, neuroanatomists point out that the theory is incorrect in claiming direct communication between the brainstem branchiomotor nuclei and the visceromotor portion of the nucleus ambiguus. Evolutionary biologists consider the presence of myelinated vagus nerve fibers in lungfish leading from the nucleus ambiguus to the heart a contradiction of the theory's view of the mammalian nucleus ambiguus.

Polyvagal theory takes its name from the vagus nerve, a cranial nerve that forms a primary component of the parasympathetic nervous system. The traditional view of the autonomic nervous system presents a two-part system: the sympathetic nervous system, which is more activating ("fight or flight"), and the parasympathetic nervous system, which supports health, growth, and restoration ("rest and digest"). Polyvagal theory views the parasympathetic nervous system as being further split into two distinct branches: a "ventral vagal system" which supports social engagement, and a "dorsal vagal system" which supports immobilization behaviors, both "rest and digest" and defensive immobilization or "shutdown". This "social engagement system" is a hybrid state of activation and calming that plays a role in the ability to socially engage.

== Theory ==
The vagus, or tenth cranial nerve, is a primary component of the autonomic nervous system, which operates the internal organs. It transmits parasympathetic signals to and from the heart, lungs, and digestive tract. The vagal system is claimed to be inhibitory of primal instincts by being part of the parasympathetic nervous system, in opposition to the sympathetic-adrenal system, involved in mobilization behaviors.

Polyvagal theory was developed in 1994 by Porges, who at the time was director of the Brain-Body Center at the University of Illinois at Chicago. It focuses on the structure and function of the two efferent branches of the vagus cranial nerve, which originate from the medulla. Each branch is claimed to be associated with a different adaptive behavioral strategy; the ventral branches more restful in nature and the dorsal ones more active in nature.

According to the theory, three organizational principles can be distinguished:

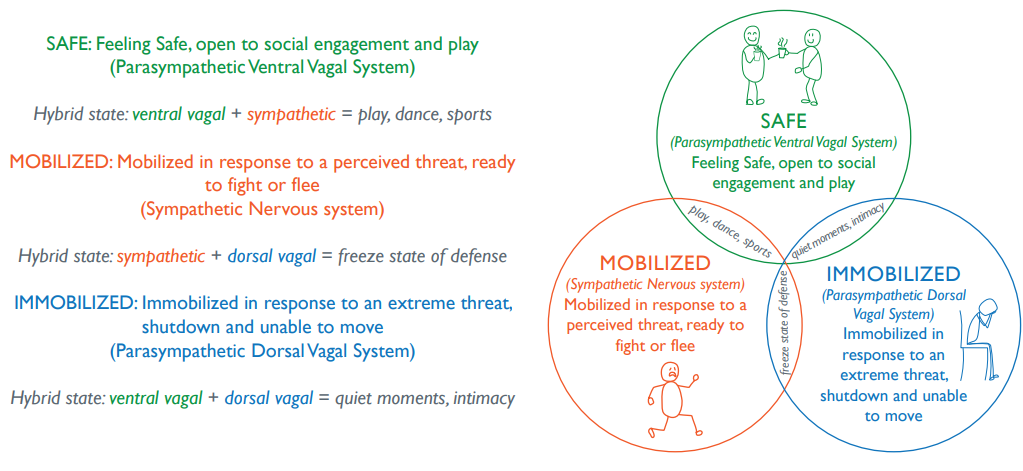
Explanatory diagram

1. Hierarchy: The autonomic nervous system reacts in three reaction patterns, which are activated in a specific order.
2. Neuroception: In contrast to perception, it is here a cognition without awareness, triggered by a stimulus such as danger.
3. Co-regulation: The need to feel safe enough to allow oneself to be in relationships, which is difficult for traumatized people.

Porges describes the three neural circuits as regulators for reactive behavior. His findings were taken into account by some theorists of childhood trauma, with related techniques used by trauma therapists such as Bessel van der Kolk, Peter A. Levine and Marianne Bentzen.

=== Anatomical hypothesis ===
Polyvagal theory combines ideas from evolutionary biology and neurology, to claim that autonomic reactions have adapted to the phylogenetic development of neural circuits. It claims that the sympathetic nervous system, and two distinct branches of the parasympathetic nervous system, are phylogenetically ordered and activated for responses. The branches of the vagal nerve are claimed to serve different evolutionary stress responses in mammals: the more primitive branch is said to elicit immobilization behaviors (e.g., feigning death), whereas the more evolved branch is said to be linked to social communication and self-soothing behaviors. These functions are claimed to follow a phylogenetic hierarchy, where the most primitive systems are activated only when the more evolved functions fail.

According to the theory, these neural pathways regulate autonomic states and the expression of emotional and social behaviour. It claims that in mammals, facial expressions are connected to internal physical reactions, such as cardiac and digestive changes, and in general physiological state dictates the range of behaviour and psychological experience.

Claims about the nature of stress, emotion, and social behaviour are traditionally studied via peripheral indices of arousal such as heart rate, cortisol level and skin conductance. Polyvagal theory champions the measurement of vagal tone as a new index of stress vulnerability and reactivity, including in populations with affective disorders.

=== Proposed dorsal vagal complex (DVC) ===
The dorsal branch of the vagus nerve originates in the dorsal motor nucleus and is postulated by polyvagal theory to be the phylogenetically older branch. This branch is unmyelinated and exists in most vertebrates. Polyvagal theory calls this the "vegetative vagus" because it sees it as being associated with primal survival strategies of primitive vertebrates, reptiles, and amphibians. Under certain conditions, these animals "freeze" when threatened, conserving their metabolic resources. This draws on the simplifying claims of the triune brain theory which are no longer considered accurate due to the many exceptions to this rule (see Triune brain § Status of the model).

The DVC provides primary control of subdiaphragmatic visceral organs, such as the digestive tract. Under normal conditions, the DVC maintains regulation of these digestive processes. However, prolonged disinhibition can be lethal for mammals, as it results in apnea and bradycardia.

=== Proposed ventral vagal complex (VVC) ===
With increased neural complexity as seen in mammals (due to phylogenetic development), there is said to have evolved a more sophisticated system to enrich behavioral and affective responses to an increasingly complex environment. The ventral branch of the vagus originates in the nucleus ambiguus and is myelinated to provide more speed in responding. Polyvagal theory calls this the "smart vagus" because it associates it with the regulation of sympathetic "fight or flight" behaviors by way of social affiliative behaviors. These behaviors are said to include social communication and self-soothing and calming. In other words, this branch of the vagus is said to inhibit or disinhibit defensive limbic circuits, depending on the situation. Note: Attributing defensive behaviours purely to the limbic system is an oversimplification, as these are triggered by perceived threats, thus requiring an interplay of brain areas performing sensory integration, memory, and semantic knowledge with the limbic system to be elicited. Similarly, the regulation of emotions requires a complex interplay of higher cognitive areas with limbic ones. The vagus nerve mediates the control of supradiaphragmatic visceral organs, such as the esophagus, bronchi, pharynx, and larynx. It also exerts an important influence on the heart. When vagal tone to the heart's pacemaker is high, a baseline or resting heart rate is produced. In other words, the vagus acts as a restraint, or brake, limiting heart rate. However, when vagal tone is removed, there is little inhibition to the pacemaker, and according to polyvagal theory, rapid mobilization ("fight/flight") can be activated in times of stress, but without having to engage the sympathetic-adrenal system, as activation comes at a severe biological cost. Note: While the vagus nerve's role in downregulating the heart rate is well-established, the notion that a fight-or-flight response can be triggered without engaging the sympathetic nervous system is not substantiated by any evidence.

=== Vagal tone as a marker of stress ===
In order to maintain homeostasis, the central nervous system responds constantly, via neural feedback, to environmental cues. Stressful events disrupt the rhythmic structure of autonomic states, and subsequently, behaviors. Since the vagus plays such an integral role in the peripheral nervous system via regulation of heart rate, Porges suggests that the amplitude of respiratory sinus arrhythmia (RSA) is a good index of parasympathetic nervous system activity via the cardiac vagus. That is, RSA is proposed as a measurable, noninvasive way to see how the vagus modulates heart rate activity in response to stress. If true, this method could be useful to measure individual differences in stress reactivity.

RSA is the widely used measure of the amplitude of heart rate rhythm associated with the rate of spontaneous breathing. Research has shown that amplitude of RSA is an accurate indicator of the efferent influence of the vagus on the heart. Since inhibitory effects of the VVC branch of the vagus allow for a wide range of adaptive, prosocial behaviors, it has been theorized that individuals with greater vagal tone are able to exhibit a greater range of such behaviors. On the other hand, decreased vagal tone is associated with illnesses and medical complications that compromise the CNS. These complications may reduce one's capacity to respond to stress appropriately.

==== Clinical applications in the human fetus ====
Healthy human fetuses have high variability in heart rate, which is mediated by the vagus. On the other hand, heart rate decelerations, which are also mediated by the vagus, are a sign of fetal distress. More specifically, prolonged withdrawal of vagal influence on the heart creates a physiological vulnerability to the influence of the dorsal vagal complex, which in turn produces bradycardia (very low heart rate). However, the onset of this deceleration is commonly preceded by transitory tachycardia, which is reflective of the immediate effects of ventral vagal complex withdrawal.

== Therapeutic applications ==
A 2024 review in Developmental Psychobiology analyzed polyvagal theory's neurobiological aspects in light of 25 years of research, examining both strengths and limitations through evidence from comparative anatomy, embryology, epigenetics, and neuroscience. A 2022 review in the Japanese journal Brain and Nerve described the theory's potential applications in psychotherapy, particularly regarding trauma pathophysiology and the role of social interaction in treatment.

== Criticism ==
In a 2021 publication, Porges stated that "the theory was not proposed to be either 'proven' or 'falsified', rather to be informed by research and modified". Falsifiability is a central tenet of the scientific method.

In a 2023 review of the literature, Paul Grossman lists five premises of polyvagal theory and states that "there is broad consensus among experts [...] that each basic physiological assumption of the polyvagal theory is untenable. Much of the existing evidence, upon which these consensuses are grounded, strongly indicates that the underlying polyvagal hypotheses have been falsified."

Although proponents like Bessel van der Kolk praise the theory's explanatory power, Grossman considers the explanations offered by the theory unsubstantiated.

In a 2025 paper in Clinical Neuropsychiatry, Porges responded to these critiques, stating that "contrary to claims that Polyvagal Theory lacks falsifiability, the theory has generated a range of specific, testable predictions," including hierarchical recruitment of autonomic states under threat, the influence of social cues on vagal tone, and the effects of acoustic interventions on emotion regulation. Porges characterized the critiques by Grossman and Taylor as "misrepresentations" that "overlook the hierarchical structure of the autonomic nervous system or misunderstand the role of neuroception in mediating physiological state shifts."

=== Neuroscientific claims ===
Neuhuber and Berthoud (2022) state that polyvagal theory's "basic phylogenetic and functional-anatomical tenets do not withstand closer scrutiny". They argue that polyvagal theory incorrectly portrays the role of the different vagal nuclei in mediating the freeze response. According to their analysis, the evidence "does not support a role of the 'dorsal vagal complex' in freezing as proposed by the PVT" and the dorsal vagal complex "should not be linked to passive defensive behavior".

Regarding the proposed "ventral vagal complex", they state that "the PVT, by construing a 'new ventral vagal complex' encompassing the entire branchiomotor column ascribed to the vagus much more than it actually can serve." They see it as "misleading to propose that brainstem branchiomotor ('source') nuclei 'communicate directly with the visceromotor portion of the nucleus ambiguus'", and conclude that the relevant networks "should not be termed 'ventral vagal complex'. This terminology may insinuate that the vagus is a "prime mover". This not the case [...]".

Taylor, Wang & Leite (2022) similarly regard it as "invalid to refer to this as a 'vagal system' or to postulate the existence of a 'smart vagus'."

=== Evolutionary claims ===
Grossman and Taylor (2007) argue that there is no evidence that the dorsal motor nucleus (DMN) is an evolutionarily more primitive center of the brainstem parasympathetic system than the nucleus ambiguus (NA), and review evidence to the contrary.

A more recent paper by Monteiro et al. (2018) finding myelinated vagus nerve fibers of lungfish leading from the nucleus ambiguus to the heart also indicates that polyvagal theory's hypothesis that the nucleus ambiguus is unique to mammals is incorrect. They state that "the mechanisms [Porges] identifies as solely mammalian are undeniably present in the lungfish that sits at the evolutionary base of the air-breathing vertebrates."

Grossman (2023) concurs, stating that "the polyvagal notion that the ventral vagal area is unique to mammals is opposed by years of evidence" and that the "findings, as a whole, firmly and consistently contradict the polyvagal hypotheses that propose the [dorsal vagal motor nucleus] as the "source nucleus" of unmyelinated pathways and the [nucleus ambiguus] as the "source nucleus" of myelinated pathways in mammals".

Results reviewed by Taylor, Leite and Skovgaard (2010) also "refute the proposition that centrally controlled cardiorespiratory coupling is restricted to mammals, as propounded by the polyvagal theory of Porges". In Taylor, Wang & Leite's 2022 review, the evidence for the presence of cardio-respiratory interactions similar to respiratory sinus arrhythmia (RSA) and their potential purpose in blood oxygenation in many vertebrate species (both air- and water-breathing) leads them to conclude that RSA may be a relic of older cardio-respiratory systems, contrary to polyvagal assumptions.

The dichotomy between asocial reptiles and social mammals subscribed to by polyvagal theory has been contested. Doody, Burghardt & Dinets consider several ways of assessing and classifying animal sociality and state that "Porges' dichotomy is incorrect. While many mammals (particularly humans) may show more complex social behavior than reptiles, there is considerable overlap in social tendencies between the two groups. The labels 'social' and 'asocial' are too crude to have utility in a comparative framework of social behavior and should not be used to describe taxa". Listing examples of social behavior in reptiles and other non-mammal vertebrates, they observe that "PT appears to rest upon 20th century folk interpretation of vertebrate evolutionary biology rather than on current scientific understanding of it."

=== Claims regarding cardiac functioning ===
Polyvagal theory proposes a relationship between RSA responses and forms of psychopathology, but a meta-analysis finds the empirical evidence to be inconclusive.

According to Grossman and Taylor, the existing research indicates that respiratory sinus arrhythmia is not a reliable marker of vagal tone, since it is subject to both respiratory variables and sympathetic (beta-adrenergic) influences in addition to vagal influences. In addition, they argue that the results of Porges' 2003 study on two species of lizard was flawed due to incorrect measurements of heart rate variability.

Reviewing more recent evidence, Paul Grossman again finds RSA not "a direct measure of cardiac vagal tone" due to confounding factors. In addition, he concludes that contrary to polyvagal claims "there is no credible evidence that the [dorsal vagal motor nucleus] plays any role in massive bradycardia", and that it "appears to have almost no effect upon vagal heart rate responses". In a 2025 paper in Clinical Neuropsychiatry, Porges responded to these critiques, stating that "contrary to claims that Polyvagal Theory lacks falsifiability, the theory has generated a range of specific, testable predictions," including hierarchical recruitment of autonomic states under threat, the influence of social cues on vagal tone, and the effects of acoustic interventions on emotion regulation. Porges characterized the critiques by Grossman and Taylor as "misrepresentations" that "overlook the hierarchical structure of the autonomic nervous system or misunderstand the role of neuroception in mediating physiological state shifts."

== See also ==
- Popular psychology
- Fringe science
- Emotional dysregulation
- Fight-or-flight response
- Freezing behavior
- Tend and befriend
- Autonomic nervous system
