= Somatic experiencing =

Alternative therapy for treating trauma

Somatic experiencing (SE) is a form of alternative therapy aimed at treating trauma and stress-related disorders, such as post-traumatic stress disorder (PTSD). The primary goal of SE is to modify the trauma-related stress response through bottom-up processing. The client's attention is directed toward internal sensations (interoception, proprioception, and kinaesthesis) rather than cognitive or emotional experiences. Peter A. Levine developed the method.

SE sessions are typically in-person and involve clients tracking their physical experiences. Practitioners are often mental health practitioners such as social workers, psychologists, therapists, psychiatrists, Rolfers, Feldenkrais practitioners, yoga and Daoyin therapists, educators, clergy, occupational therapists, etc.

== Theory and methods ==
=== Basis ===
Somatic experiencing, also known as somatic therapy, is heavily predicated on psychoanalyst Wilhelm Reich's theories of blocked emotion and how emotion is held and released from the body. It differs from traditional talk therapies such as cognitive behavioral therapy, which has a primary focus on the mind and not the body, by prioritizing disturbing thoughts and behavior patterns and seeking to change them. Instead, somatic therapy treats the body as the starting point for healing. It is less about desensitizing people to uncomfortable sensations and more about relieving tension in the body.

Many Western somatic psychotherapy approaches are based on either Reich or Elsa Gindler. Gindler's vision preceded Reich's and greatly influenced him. Gindler's direct link to the United States was Charlotte Selver. Selver greatly influenced Peter Levine's work and the development of fine somatic tracking. Selver taught thousands of Americans her "sensory awareness" method at the Esalen Institute, including Levine. Somatic experiencing, like many of its sister modalities, is indebted to both Gindler and Reich. Each method has its twist that differentiates it in style "in a manner alike to the different sects of an overarching religion" and even becoming "cult-like" at one time.

=== Definitions ===
Peter Payne and colleagues describe SE as "not a form of exposure therapy" in that it "avoids direct and intense evocation of traumatic memories, instead approaching the charged memories indirectly and very gradually." Leitch and colleagues describe the approach similarly as "working with small gradations of traumatic activation alternated with the use of bodily resources. Working with small increments of traumatic material is a key component of SE, as is the development of somatic resources". In SE people "gently and incrementally reimagine and experience" and are "slowly working in graduated 'doses'". Anderson and colleagues, however, states that SE "includes techniques known from interoceptive exposure for panic attacks, by combining arousal reduction strategies with mild exposure therapy."

=== Systematic desensitization ===
One of the first exposure therapies, systematic desensitization, which Joseph Wolpe developed in the 1940s to treat anxiety disorders and phobias, is similarly described. Wolpe's systematic desensitization "consists of exposing the patient, while in a state of emotional calmness, to a small 'dose' of something he fears" using imaginal methods that allow the therapist to "control precisely the beginning and ending of each presentation". This graduated exposure is similar to the SE concept of "titration". Wolpe also relied on relaxation responses alternating with incremental or graduated exposure to anxiety-provoking stimuli, and this practice was standard within cognitive-behavioral protocols long before somatic experiencing was trademarked in 1989.

=== Pendulation ===
One element of somatic experiencing therapy is "pendulation", a supposed natural intrinsic rhythm of the organism between contraction and expansion. The concept and its comparison to unicellular organisms can be traced to Wilhelm Reich, the father of somatic psychotherapy. Alexander Lowen and John Pierrakos, both psychiatrists, built upon Reich's foundational theories, developing Bioenergetics, and also compared the rhythm of this life-force-energy to a pendulum. The SE concept of the "healing vortex" is grounded in Ackert Ahsen's "law of bipolarity" according to Eckberg. Levine credits his inspiration for the healing vortex to a dream and not Ahsen. This principle involves the pendulatory tendency to weave back and forth between traumatic material and healing images and parasympathetic responses. Ahsen's "principle of bipolar configurations" asserts that "every significant eidetic state involves configuration . . . around two opposed nuclei which contend against each other. Every ISM of the negative type has a counter-ISM of the positive type."

=== SIBAM (Sensation, Image, Behavior, Affect, and Meaning) ===
Peter Levine put forth that, during the 1970s, he "developed a model" called "SIBAM", which broke down all experience into five channels of "Sensation, Image, Behavior, Affect and Meaning (or Cognition)." SIBAM is considered both a model of experience and a model of dissociation. Multimodal therapy, developed by Arnold Lazarus in the 1970s, is similar to the SIBAM model in that it broke down experience into "Behavior, Affect, Sensation, Image, and Cognition (or Meaning)". Somatic experiencing integrates the tracking of Gendlin's "felt sense" into the model. Levine has made use of Gendlin's focusing approach in Somatic experiencing. "Dr. Levine emphasizes that the felt sense is the medium through which we understand all sensation, and that it reflects our total experience at a given moment."

Lazarus also incorporated Gendlin's "focusing" method into his model to circumvent cognitive blocks. Incorporation of this "bottom-up", "felt sense" method is shared by both SE and multimodal therapy. Lazarus, like Levine, was heavily influenced by Akhter Ahsen's "ISM unity" or "eidetic" concept. In 1968, Ahsen explained the ISM this way: "It is a tri-dimensional unity. . . . With this image is attached a characteristic body feeling peculiar to the image, which we call the somatic pattern. With this somatic pattern is attached a third state composed of a constellation of vague and clear meanings, which we call the meaning." That sensation, for Ahsen, included affective and physiological states.

Ahsen went on to apply his ISM concept to traumatic experiences, which is strikingly similar to Peter Levine's later developed model. In the SIBAM model, like in the ISM model, the separate dimensions of experience in trauma can be "dissociated from one another".

=== Coupling dynamics ===
In the Somatic Experiencing method, there is the concept of "coupling dynamics," in which the "under-coupled" state, where the traumatic experience exists, is not as a unity but as dissociated elements of the SIBAM. In SE, "the arousal in one element can trigger the arousal in other elements (overcoupling) or it can restrict arousal in other elements (undercoupling)." An SE therapist "often has to work to uncouple responses (if responses are overcoupled) or to find ways to couple them (if the responses are undercoupled) in order for therapy to progress and to help the individual to restore balance in his or her emotional life." Ashen's description clearly matches this concept. Additionally, treatment of "post-traumatic stress through imagery", like SE, "emphasizes exploitation of the somatic aspect over the visual component of Ashen's ISM model because of the strong emotional and physiological components that present themselves frontally in these cases."

=== Stress ===
According to SE, post-traumatic stress symptoms originate from an "overreaction of the innate stress system due to the overwhelming character of the traumatic event. In the traumatic situation, people are unable to complete the initiated psychological and physiological defensive reaction." Standard cognitive behavioral understanding of PTSD and anxiety disorders was grounded in an understanding of fight, flight, or freeze mechanisms in addition to conscious and unconscious, preprogrammed, automatic primal defensive action systems. SE is theorised to work through the "generation of new corrective interoceptive experiences" or the therapeutic 'renegotiating' of the traumatic response. Due to this focus, Somatic Experiencing claims it is unique and may be more effective than cognitive-behavioral models. The coupling dynamics model/SIBAM model in SE, however, is reminiscent of the Pavlovian fear conditioning and extinction models underlying exposure-based extinction paradigms of cognitive behavior therapy. Additionally, graduated exposure therapy and other fear extinction methods are similarly theorized to work due to the power of corrective experiences enhanced by "active coping" methods.

=== Discharge ===
In Somatic Experiencing therapy, "discharge" is facilitated in response to arousal to enable the client's body to return to a controlled condition. Discharge may be in the form of tears, a warm sensation, unconscious movement, the ability to breathe easily again, or other responses that demonstrate the autonomic nervous system returning to its baseline. The intention of this process is to reinforce the client's inherent capacity to self-regulate. The charge/discharge concept in Somatic Experiencing has its origins in Reichian therapy and Bioenergetics. Levine's predecessors in the somatic psychotherapy field clearly understood the dynamics of shock trauma and the failure of mobilization of fight or flight impulses in creating symptoms of anxiety neuroses and to maintain a chronic "state of emergency". They also understood that healing involved completing this "charge" associated with the truncated fight-or-flight impulses.

=== Polyvagal theory ===
Somatic Experiencing is also predicated on the Polyvagal Theory of human emotion developed by Stephen Porges. Many of the Polyvagal theory tenets incorporated in the Somatic Experiencing training are controversial and unproven. The SE therapy concepts, such as "dorsal vagal shutdown" with bradycardia that are used to describe "freeze" and collapse states of trauma patients, are controversial since it appears the ventral vagal branch, not the dorsal vagal branch, mediates this lowered heart rate and blood pressure state. Neurophysiological studies have shown that the dorsal motor nucleus has little to do with traumatic or psychologically related heart rate responses.

=== Link to shamanism ===
Levine's model, influenced by his work with shamans of "several cultures", makes wider connections "to myth and shamanism" and is "connected to these traditions". Levine "uses a story from shamanistic medicine to describe the work of body-centred trauma counselling. In shamanism, it is believed that when a person is overwhelmed by tragedy, his soul will leave his body, a belief which is concordant with our present understanding of dissociation." Levine even notes that while developing his "theoretical biophysics doctoral dissertation on accumulated stress, as well as on my body-mind approach to resolving stress and healing trauma" he had a mystical experience where he engaged in a year-long socratic dialogue with an apparition of Albert Einstein. After reportedly having a "profound" dream Peter Levine believed he had been "assigned" the task "to protect this ancient knowledge from the Celtic Stone Age temples, and the Tibetan tradition, and to bring it to the scientific Western way of looking at things..."

== Evidence ==
A 2019 systemic literature review noted that a stronger investment in clinical trials was needed to determine the efficacy of Somatic Experiencing. A 2021 literature review stated: "Findings provide preliminary evidence for positive effects of SE on PTSD-related symptoms. Moreover, initial evidence suggests that SE has a positive impact on affective and somatic symptoms and measures of well-being in both traumatized and non-traumatized samples. Practitioners and clients identified resource-orientation and use of touch as method-specific key factors of SE. Yet, an overall studies quality assessment as well as a Cochrane analysis of risk of bias indicate that the overall study quality is mixed."

It concluded: "The results concerning effectiveness and method-specific key factors of SE are promising; yet, require more support from unbiased RCT-research. Future research should focus on filling this gap". It also noted that "SE attracts growing interest in clinical application despite the lack of empirical research. Yet, the current evidence base is weak and does not (yet) fully accomplish the high standards for clinical effectiveness research."

== Regulation ==
Unlike some of its sister somatic modalities (biodynamic craniosacral therapy, polarity therapy, etc.), Somatic Experiencing is not listed as an exempt modality from massage practice acts in the United States, and is not eligible to belong to The Federation of Therapeutic Massage, Bodywork and Somatic Practice Organizations, which was formed to protect the members' right to practice as an independent profession. Members of the Federation each have a professional regulating body with an enforceable code of ethics and standards of practice, continuing education requirements, a process of certifying and ensuring competency and a minimum of 500 hours of training. Somatic Experiencing practitioners do not meet any of these criteria unless they are already certified or licensed in another discipline. While the model has a growing evidence base as a modality "for treating people with post-traumatic stress disorder (PTSD)" that "integrates body awareness into the psychotherapeutic process", not all Somatic Experiencing practitioners practice psychotherapy and therefore have varying scopes of practice, for example, not all are qualified to work with people with mental disorders. SE instructs participants that they "are responsible for operating within their professional scope of practice and for abiding by state and federal laws".

== See also ==
- Body psychotherapy – Academic discipline
- Embodied cognition – Interdisciplinary theory
- Psychosomatic medicine – Interdisciplinary medical field exploring various influences on bodily processes
