= Haider A. Khan =

American economist

Haider Ali Khan is a professor of economics at the Josef Korbel School of International Studies at the University of Denver. He has been recognized for his expertise on social accounting matrix (SAM)-based economic modeling, which he employs to study problems in international economics and development. His areas of research include poverty and inequality, environment, foreign aid, trade and investment, as well as economy-wide modeling. Khan is listed among the top five percent of almost 14,000 professional contributors to IDEAS, and his report on women's rights as human rights is among the top ten in the category of political theory and political behavior on the SSRN website.

A significant number of Khan's works discuss the issues of regional cooperation and governance, the impacts of democratization on economic growth and economic development, human capabilities and the role they play on individual wellbeing. Khan has been working on the development of the Theory of Deep Democracy, which he has thus far applied to his proactive studies of Bangladesh's model of governance, as well as his studies of women's rights as human rights. He has worked closely with the International Labor Office, the Ford Foundation, the World Bank, the UNU-WIDER Project, the UNDP, and the Asian Development Bank.

== Education ==
Khan received his master's degree and Ph.D. at Cornell University. He attended Eisenhower College for his undergraduate education and graduated in economics, mathematics, and philosophy. He subsequently went on complete his graduate work at Cornell University, where he began his work on social accounting matrices.

== Life and work ==
Khan was a visiting professor at Tokyo University and a visiting scholar at Hitotsubashi University, Tilburg University, People’s University in Beijing and UNU-WIDER. He has served as a senior economic adviser to UNCTAD in Geneva. He was also a distinguished visiting fellow at the Asian Development Bank Institute, Tokyo and an adviser to the Asian Development Bank.

His major areas of expertise are globalization, economic and econometric modeling, economic theory, international and development economics and political economy. His work ranges from economy-wide modeling of technology and capital flows to the political and economic theories of democracy and justice. He has published twelve books and more than one hundred articles in professional journals. Some of his books and articles have been translated in several other languages.

Khan has received the Distinguished Scholar Award from the Academy of International Business and delivered an invited address on “An evolutionary approach to reconstructing the global financial architecture: the extended panda’s thumb principle” at the annual meeting in Dallas.

Khan is also a poet, translator, and literary critic. His early career was in theater, television, radio, and film where he participated in a number of progressive democratic and anti-imperialist projects. He has written books and articles on Modernism, Surrealism and Postmodernism in film and literature, and on Octavio Paz, James Joyce, Guillaume Apollinaire, Rabindranath Tagore, Modern Japanese Poetry and the Japanese Haiku and Renku master Basho, among others, in English and several other languages.

== Affiliated institutions ==
Khan received his M.A. and Ph.D. from Cornell University. His fields were economic theory, econometrics and economic development. His undergraduate degree is summa cum laude in mathematics, philosophy and economics from Eisenhower College. He is now a distinguished professor of economics at the Josef Korbel School of International Studies, University of Denver. He has been affiliated in various capacities with the UN, the World Bank, ILO, UNU, Universities and research institutes in Western Europe, China, Japan, India, Indonesia, Costa Rica and Mexico.

During his journey in Italy in November 2017, as visiting professor, he espoused his eight propositions about "crisis and globalization" during a "lectio magistralis" in Santa Maria Capua Vetere at the Universitá degli Studi della Campania Luigi Vanvitelli with the collaboration of two Italian economics professors, Salvatore D'Acunto and Francesco Schettino, giving all together a great contribute to the different aspects of the question.

== Books ==
- Transitional Economies and Regional Economic Development Strategies, UNCRD, 1996.
- Technology, Energy and Development, Edward Elgar,1997.
- Technology Systems and Development, Macmillan, 1997.
- African Debt and Sustainable Development, Phelps-Stokes Fund Monograph, 1997.
- Technology, Democracy, and Development, Edward Elgar,1998.
- Innovation and Growth in East Asia: the Future of Miracles, Palgrave/Macmillan, 2004.
- Global Markets and Financial Crises: Asia's Mangled Miracle, Palgrave/Macmillan, 2004.
- Poverty Strategies in Asia (with John Weiss), Edward Elgar, 2007.
- Reducing Poverty:Patterns of Potential Human Progress, Oxford University Press, (with Barry Hughes et als.), 2008.
- China’s National Innovation System at the Cross-roads, LAP Lambert Academic Publishing, Berlin, Germany (with Alberto Gabriele), 2010.
