= World Council for Psychotherapy =

International organization

The World Council for Psychotherapy is an NGO with consultative status at the Economic and Social Council of the United Nations. It was founded in 1995, has its headquarters in Vienna, and holds a World Congress every three years with more than a thousand participants.

== Objectives ==
The main objectives of the association are the promotion of psychotherapy on all continents (based on the principles in the Strasbourg Declaration on Psychotherapy in 1990), to improve the conditions of patients, to cooperate with national and international organizations to improve crisis management and peacekeeping, and to unify world training standards. Members are both psychotherapists and organizations. President of the WCP is Alfred Pritz.

The World Certificate for Psychotherapy (WCPC) is only awarded on the basis of recognized psychotherapy training and aims to encourage mobility within the profession. Each year, together with the city of Vienna, the Council awards the International Sigmund Freud Award for Psychotherapy.
