= John Pierrakos =

American psychiatrist (1921–2001)

- Born: February 8, 1921; Neon Oitylo, Greece
- Died: February 1, 2001 (aged 79)
- Education: M.D. (1947), University of the State of New York
- Occupation: Psychiatrist
- Known for: Bioenergetic analysis

John Pierrakos (February 8, 1921 – February 1, 2001) was an American physician and psychiatrist. A student of Wilhelm Reich, he developed bioenergetic analysis, a form of mind-body psychotherapy, with his then-colleague Alexander Lowen (December 23, 1910 – October 28, 2008). Pierrakos was the founder and director of the Institute of Core Energetics (1973-2001), co-founder of the Bioenergetics Institute in New York, NY with Lowen (1955-1970), and co-founder of The Pathwork Center, Phoenicia, NY, in association with his wife, Eva Pierrakos.

== Early life ==
John Pierrakos was born in a small town, Neon Oitylon, in Greece. In 1939, due to World War II, he left Greece for the United States. Pierrakos received a Doctor of Medicine from University of the State of New York in 1947. He worked as a Junior Staff Psychiatrist at Kings County Psychiatric Hospital in Brooklyn until 1949. He earned his Ph.D. in psychiatry.

He worked as a Lieutenant Commander and assistant director of the Psychiatric Treatment Center in the US Navy in Portsmouth, Virginia, from 1952 to 1954. He then went into private psychiatric practice in New York City from 1954 to 1955, including experimental research in energy and consciousness with applications to psychotherapy, before founding the Bioenergetics Institute with Lowen.

== Personal life ==
In 1972 he married Eva Pierrakos, who was the daughter of the writer Jakob Wassermann.

== Career and research ==
In the late 1940s, Pierrakos came to know Reich and studied with him until he ran into trouble with the authorities for his teachings and practices concerning Orgone energy (his version of what was otherwise known as prana or psychic energy). While Reich worked with his patient's breath while lying on a bed they came to the conclusion that a person's upright position is important to enabling a whole range of movements. They developed exercises which they believe open the energy flow in the body, freeing blocked impulses as well as the consciousness of repressed memories and feelings.

Pierrakos and Alexander Lowen were both students of Wilhelm Reich. They collaborated to build on Reich's work, co-founding The Bioenergetics Institute in 1955. They introduced the concept of Grounding, which theorises that a person is energetically connected to the earth, lending a sense of inner security. The theory posits that this causes the ego to be more rooted in the body and becomes more resilient, flexible, and able to surrender.

In 1969 Pierrakos parted with Lowen, disagreeing with Lowen's sole reliance on energetic release, emphasising the need to "own" the lower self for permanent integration of healing into the personality and opened "The Center for the New Man" along with his wife Eva Pierrakos. The institute was later renamed as "The Pathwork Center" in Phoenicia in upstate New York. He integrated The Pathwork concepts such as the Mask, Lower Self and Higher Self, the Idealized Self, and Life Task with Bioenergetic physical interventions which addressed the armoring in the body. He recognized the body's subtle energy system as a tool for diagnosis and healing, and treated the patient as a whole physical-emotional-spiritual unit, with the source of healing lying within itself.

In 1973, he founded the Institute of Core Energetics in New York.

== Published works ==
- Core Energetics, Developing the Capacity to Love and Heal, LifeRhythm, Mendocino, California (1973) John C. Pierrakos (2005). Core Energetics: Developing the Capacity to Love and Heal. Core Evolution Publishing. ISBN 978-0-9774394-0-9.
- The Case of the Broken Heart (1974)John C. Pierrakos (1974). The Case of the Broken Heart. Institute for the New Age of Man.
- The Plight of the Modern Woman (1975)John C. Pierrakos (1975). The Plight of the Modern Woman. Institute for the New Age of Man.
- Human Energy Systems Theory (1976)John C. Pierrakos (1976). Human Energy Systems Theory: History and New Growth Perspectives. Institute for the New Age of Man.
- Eros, Love & Sexuality, The Forces That Unify Man and Woman, LifeRhythm, Mendocino, California (1997) John C. Pierrakos (2001). Eros, Love & Sexuality, The Forces That Unify Man and Woman. Mendocino, California: LifeRhythm. p. 123. ISBN 978-0940795211.
