= Body psychotherapy =

Academic discipline

Body psychotherapy, also called body-oriented psychotherapy, is an approach to psychotherapy which applies basic principles of somatic psychology. It originated in the work of Pierre Janet, Sigmund Freud and particularly Wilhelm Reich who developed it as vegetotherapy. Branches also were developed by Alexander Lowen, and John Pierrakos, both patients and students of Reich, like Reichian body-oriented psychotherapy and Gerda Boyesen.

== History ==
Wilhelm Reich and the post-Reichians are considered the central element of body psychotherapy. From the 1930s, Reich became known for the idea that muscular tension reflected repressed emotions, what he called 'body armour', and developed a way to use pressure to produce emotional release in his clients. Reich was expelled from the psychoanalytic mainstream and his work found a home in the 'growth movement' of the 1960s and 1970s and in the countercultural project of 'liberating the body'. Perhaps as a result, body psychotherapy was marginalised within mainstream psychology and was seen in the 1980s and 1990s as 'the radical fringe of psychotherapy'. Body psychotherapy's marginal position may be connected with the tendency for charismatic leaders to emerge within it, from Reich onwards.

Alexander Lowen in his Bioenergetic analysis and John Pierrakos in Core energetics extended Reich's finding of the segmented nature of body armour: "The muscular armour has a segmented arrangement...always transverse to the torso, never along it". Lowen claimed that "No words are so clear as the language of body expression". Subsequently, the Chiron Centre for Body Psychotherapy added influences from Gestalt therapy to their approach.

The early 2000s saw a 'renaissance of body psychotherapy' which was part of a broader increased interest in the body and embodiment in psychology and other disciplines including philosophy, sociology, anthropology and cultural studies. Object relations theory has arguably opened the way more recently for a fuller consideration of the body-mind connection in psychotherapy.

== Branches ==
There are numerous branches of body psychotherapy, often tracing their origins to particular individuals: for example, 'Bioenergetic analysis' to the work of Lowen and Pierrakos; 'Radix' to the work of Chuck Kelley; Organismic Psychotherapy to the work of Malcolm and Katherine Brown; 'Biosynthesis' to the work of David Boadella; 'Biodynamic Psychology' to that of Gerda Boyesen; 'Rubenfeld Synergy' to Ilana Rubenfeld's work; 'Body-Mind Centering' to Bonnie Bainbridge Cohen's work, and 'Body-mind Psychotherapy' to Susan Aposhyan; the development of Jack Painter's 'Postural and Energetic Integration' into a psychotherapeutic modality.

Many of these contributors to body psychotherapy were influenced by the work of Wilhelm Reich, while adding and incorporating a variety of other influences. Syntheses of these approaches are also becoming accepted and recognised in their own right (e.g. The Chiron Approach: Chiron Association of Body Psychotherapists).

Alongside the body psychotherapies built directly on the work of Reich, there is a branch of post-Jungian body psychotherapies, developed from Jung's idea of the 'somatic unconscious'. While many post-Jungians dismiss Reich and do not work with the body, contributors to Jungian derived body psychotherapy include Arnold Mindell with his concept of the 'dreambody' and the development of process oriented psychology. Process oriented psychology is known for its focus on the body and movement.

Body psychotherapy and dance movement therapy have developed separately and are professionally distinguished, however they have significant common ground and shared principles including the importance of non-verbal therapeutic techniques and the development of body-focused awareness.

A review of body psychotherapy research finds there is a small but growing empirical evidence base about the outcomes of body psychotherapy, however it is weakened by the fragmentation of the field into different branches and schools. The review reports that one of the strongest studies is longitudinal (2 year) outcome research conducted with 342 participants across 8 different schools (Hakomi Experiental Psychology, Unitive Body Psychotherapy, Biodynamic Psychology, Bioenergetic Analysis, Client-Centred Verbal and Body Psychotherapy, Integrative Body Psychotherapy, Body-Oriented Psychotherapy, and Biosynthesis). Overall efficacy was demonstrated in symptom reduction, however the study design limited further substantive conclusions.

The review of outcome research across different types of body-oriented psychotherapy concludes that the best evidence supports efficacy for treating somatoform/psychosomatic disorders and schizophrenia, while there is also support for 'generally good effects on subjectively experienced depressive and anxiety symptoms, somatisation and social insecurity.' A more recent review found that results in some of these domains were mixed or might have resulted from other causes (for example, somatic symptoms in one study improved even after therapy had ended, suggesting that the improvements may have been unrelated to the therapy).

== Trauma ==
Body psychotherapy is one modality used in a multi-modal approach to treating psychological trauma, particularly post-traumatic stress disorder (PTSD) and complex post-traumatic stress disorder (C-PTSD). Other body-based modalities, such as Tension and Trauma Releasing Exercises (TRE), are utilized within these frameworks to assist with autonomic regulation and stress recovery.

Recovering a sense of physical boundaries through sensorimotor psychotherapy is an important part of re-establishing trust in the traumatised. Blending somatic and cognitive awareness, such an approach reaches back for inspiration to the pioneering work of Janet, as well as employing the more recent work of António Damásio.

The necessity of often working without touch with traumatised victims presents a special challenge for body psychotherapists.

== Organizations ==
The European Association for Body Psychotherapy (EABP) and The United States Association for Body Psychotherapy (USABP) are two professional associations for body psychotherapists.

The EABP was founded in 1988 to promote the inclusion of body psychotherapy within a broader process of professionalisation, standardisation and regulation of psychotherapy in Europe, driven by the European Association for Psychotherapy (EAP). The EABP Board committed to meeting the EAP standards for establishing the scientific validity of psychotherapy modalities and achieved this in 1999/2000 for body psychotherapy as a whole, with various individual modalities subsequently also achieving this recognition. It was accepted as a European-Wide Accrediting Organisation in 2000.

EABP has a bi-annual conference; organises a Council of ten National B-P Associations; supports a FORUM of Body-Psychotherapy Organisations, which accredits more than 18 B-P training organisations in 10 different countries; the EABP website also provides a list of research papers; a searchable bibliography of body-psychotherapy publications, containing more than 5,000 entries.

The USABP was formed in June 1996 to provide professional representation for body psychotherapy practitioners in the United States. The USABP launched a peer-reviewed professional journal in 2002, the USA Body Psychotherapy Journal, which was published twice-yearly from 2002 to 2011. In 2012, the sister organisations, EABP and USABP, together launched the International Body Psychotherapy Journal.

There is also an Australian Association of Somatic Psychotherapy Australia.

== Cautions ==
The importance of ethical issues in body psychotherapy has been highlighted on account of the intimacy of the techniques used.

The term bioenergetic has a well established meaning in biochemistry and cell biology. Its use in RBOP (Reichian body-oriented psychotherapy) has been criticized as "ignoring the already well established universal consensus about energy existing in Science."

There is a group of psychotherapists who believe that psychotherapy should be thought of as a craft and evaluated based on the effectiveness of the treatment, rather than evaluated based on scientific validity. However, efficacy studies of body psychotherapy have been few in number and, although the results are supportive of the use of body psychotherapy in some contexts, this trend "is not overwhelming".

== See also ==
- American College of Orgonomy
- Expressive therapy
- Health applications and clinical studies of meditation
- Neuroscience
- Orgastic potency
- Psychoneuroimmunology
- Process-oriented psychology
- Somatics
