= Somatic psychology =

Form of psychotherapy

Somatic psychology or, more precisely, somatic clinical psychotherapy is a form of psychotherapy that focuses on somatic experience, including therapeutic and holistic approaches to the body. It seeks to explore and heal mental and physical injury and trauma through body awareness and movement. Wilhelm Reich was first to try to develop a clear psychodynamic approach that included the body.

Several types of body-oriented psychotherapies trace their origins back to Reich, though there have been many subsequent developments and other influences on body psychotherapy, and somatic psychology is of particular interest in trauma work. Trauma describes a long-lasting distressing experience that can be subconsciously stored and bear upon bodily health. Somatic psychology seeks to describe, explain and understand the nature of embodied consciousness and bridge the philosophical mind-body problem.

== Origins ==
The word soma comes from σῶμα, the Ancient Greek word for body; psyche (ψυχή) evolved from a word for breath to mean life or spirit; and -logy (-λογία) means “study of”. Studying the relationship between the body and the psyche, meaning mind, soul or spirit, is an ancient practice.

In the West, systematic study and debate about the body-mind relationship intensified with the Renaissance and the Scientific Revolution within the field of philosophy. These debates have been continuously reframed by philosophers throughout modern times, from René Descartes with his mind–body dualism to Patricia Churchland who applies neuroscientific insights to philosophy.

Psychology as a scientific discipline emerged gradually from the field of philosophy during the European Enlightenment. The term somatopsychic was introduced by the German psychiatrist Maximilian Jacobi (1775–1858). Sigmund Freud, a highly influential figure in the evolution of psychology, saw the body as central in his theories and techniques. In 1923 he wrote that "the ego is ultimately derived from bodily sensations, chiefly from those springing from the surface of the body. It may thus be regarded as a mental projection of the surface of the body."

Somatic psychology was first studied by Wilhelm Reich, an Austrian physician who initially was Freud’s student. His approach was influenced by Sándor Ferenczi, a Hungarian neurologist who also studied with Freud and gave insight to Reich to write his book Character Analysis. Reich was also interested in the origin of psychosomatic illness where George Groddeck, a friend of Ferenczi, influenced him a lot. He was the pioneer of somatic psychology from a medical point of view. Reich used vegetotherapy to name somatic psychology as it was touching upon the nervous system. Reich's approach goes beyond traditional therapies, it emphasizes the significance of the body on therapeutic processes, by exploring the connections between the body, brain and mind to avoid certain tensions. His discovery continues to influence contemporary therapy processes and is still relevant in today’s practice.

== Trauma storing in the body ==
Since somatic clinical psychotherapy tries to heal mental and physical injury and trauma through body awareness, it is important to know what happens in the body when trauma is experienced to be able to help the patients. Whenever someone experiences trauma, it can manifest in the body and lead to mental and physical health issues. The way trauma can lead to those health issues is closely connected to the effect it has on the hypothalamic-pituitary-adrenal (HPA) axis, since experiencing trauma leads to the HPA getting sensitized. The HPA describes the interaction between the hypothalamus, pituitary gland, and adrenal glands and is responsible for controlling body functions such as breathing, heartbeat and blood pressure as well as the endocrine stress response.

In every person that feels distressed, the amygdala sends a distress signal to the hypothalamus which activates the sympathetic nervous system and the hormone epinephrine gets released which triggers the fight-or-flight response. As long as the brain perceives the situation as dangerous, the hypothalamus releases corticotropin-releasing hormone (CRH) which leads to the release of adrenocorticotropic hormone (ACTH) which then leads to the release of cortisol. In a healthy person the HPA axis ensures that if the threat passes, the cortisol release is stopped which dilutes the stress response. If a person experienced trauma, due to the HPA axis being sensitized the HPA axis stays activated and the stress response can become chronic.

The constant release of the stress hormones can lead to physiological problems, like heart damage, diabetes and digestive issues through the excessive release of epinephrine and cortisol. Psychological effects such as anxiety, depression and disorders such as post-traumatic stress disorder (PTSD) can be triggered as well by the constant stress response of the body. To help patients with those mental and physical health issues there are different somatic therapy techniques.

== Techniques ==
Somatic therapy techniques are commonly used to treat cases like Post-traumatic stress disorder (PTSD), and complex post-traumatic stress disorder. Failed prior therapy techniques enforced the need for more sophisticated ways of caring for the condition, through which Cognitive Behavioural Somatic Therapy was introduced.

Somatic Experiencing (SE) is used as such a treatment for PTSD. It focuses on interoceptive, kinesthetic, and proprioceptive experiences, which can resolve symptoms of chronic and traumatic stress. This bottom-up process focuses on the psycho-physiological consequences of the traumatic event and aims to recalibrate the dysregulation of the bodily responses in an indirect way.

This technique aims to help regulate cognition and body, and is therefore powerful in addressing clinical dissociative disorders. Such sensorimotor techniques are often versatile and highly individual, created and adjusted for the patient, ranging in differing physical movements targeting the patient's weak point in an effort to build self-awareness and self-regulation. Such bottom-up movements stimulate self-awareness and self-regulation, like dance, breathing, and even a full-body workout depending on the individual's condition and need.

Tension and Trauma Releasing Exercises (TRE) is a related body-based approach in which a structured sequence of physical exercises is used to induce involuntary neurogenic tremors, proposed by its developer as a mechanism for discharging accumulated physiological stress and restoring autonomic regulation.

Combining somatic psychology with group therapy can be effective for attachment disorders, transference impasse, and trauma. Incorporating somatic components through sensory awareness and movement of the body, is most effective for patients who experienced physiological trauma. Teaching body awareness through monitoring physiological responses or behaviors, achieves or improves self-regulation, stabilization and a close connection to themselves or others.

== Efficacy/positivism ==
The effectiveness of somatic psychology and experiencing is still unclear. There are studies that show beneficial data points of somatic experiencing on PTSD-associated symptoms and depression. Somatic experiencing also showed positive impacts on affective and somatic symptoms, and general well-being outside of PTSD-treatment. Different limitations are encountered within studies that show positive results, such as small samples and not following rigorous methodological criteria. Insufficient research has been done to evaluate and compare the differential impacts of various modalities, despite the results of those modalities being relatively similar. The data is encouraging, but more objective studies are required to completely comprehend the efficacy of somatic psychology and experiencing, and improving the method-specific factors.

== Criticism ==
Few studies have shown the beneficial effects of implementing somatic psychology into PTSD treatment, but the conclusion on the effectiveness of somatic therapy has yet to be established. Assessing the efficacy of that method, requires a broader examination of scientific research on body-oriented psychotherapy. Another problem regarding the subject is an increased potential for re-traumatization of a patient. While somatic experiencing can be healing, it is also accessing trauma stored deeply in the body. Being such a fickle matter, if treated by an inefficiently trained practitioner, may lead to resurgence of traumatic symptoms.
