= Alexander Lowen =

American physician and psychotherapist

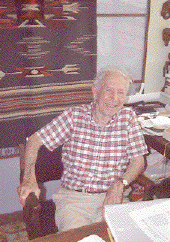
- Born: December 23, 1910; New York City, New York
- Died: October 28, 2008 (aged 97); New Canaan, Connecticut
- Education: BS (1930), City College of New York; LLB (1934), Brooklyn Law School; JSD (1936), Brooklyn Law School; MD (1951), University of Geneva
- Occupation: Psychotherapist
- Known for: Bioenergetic analysis
- Spouse: Leslie Lowen
- Children: Frederic Lowen
- Website: http://www.lowenfoundation.org/

Alexander Lowen (December 23, 1910 – October 28, 2008) was an American physician and psychotherapist.

== Life ==
A student of Wilhelm Reich in the 1940s and early 1950s in New York, Lowen developed bioenergetic analysis, a form of mind-body psychotherapy, with his then-colleague John Pierrakos. He is also noted for developing the concept of bioenergetic grounding, one of the foundational principles of bioenergetic therapy. Lowen was the founder and former executive director of the International Institute for Bioenergetic Analysis (IIBA) in New York City. The IIBA now has over 1,500 members and 54 training institutes worldwide.

Born in New York City to Jewish immigrants, Lowen received a bachelor's degree in science and business from City College of New York, an LL.B and a J.S.D (a doctorate in law) from Brooklyn Law School. His interest in the link between the mind and the body developed during this time. He enrolled in a class on character analysis with Wilhelm Reich. After training to be a therapist himself, Lowen moved to Switzerland to attend the University of Geneva.

Lowen lived and practiced for the majority of his life in New Canaan, Connecticut. He had a stroke in July 2006. The Alexander Lowen Foundation was founded in April 2007 to continue his legacy. Lowen died on October 28, 2008, at the age of 97.

== Bioenergetics (1975) ==
Lowen's 1975 book, Bioenergetics, is titled after the branch of body psychotherapy developed by him. Building upon the work of Reich (as well as some of his own previous publications), Lowen upholds that a key to existential well-being is the ability to release emotionally (syncing mind and body) via the orgasm. He maps human functions to a six-pointed star, the top three points corresponding to the head and hands (more associated with mental functions), the bottom three to the feet and sex organ (more associated with worldly functions). Lowen models stages of psychological development on a diagram functioning akin to dendrochronology.

Lowen argues that problems in body posture or incoordination often stem from childhood trauma and that bioenergetic therapy can help treat neuroses. He suggests somatic methods of therapy, including some involving touch (e.g. to represent a parent), warning the caregiver against taking personal (especially sexual) advantage of the relationship (such betrayals likely resulting in relapse). Particular methods invoke screaming and/or falling into a blanket.

Lowen sometimes correlates bodily functions with cultural associations that have emerged from them, especially word play. Lowen also draws from his own experience both undergoing and providing therapy. He shares diagrams of the apparent flow and congestion of "energy", especially regarding the visual system, but without scientific discussion of the responsible mechanisms.

== Bibliography ==
Dr. Lowen authored 14 books as well as numerous articles and other professional abstracts.

- The Language of the Body (1958)
- Love and Orgasm (1965)
- The Betrayal of the Body (1967)
- Pleasure (1970)
- Depression and the Body: The Biological Basis of Faith and Reality (1972)
- Bioenergetics (1975)
- The Way to Vibrant Health: A Manual of Bioenergetic Exercises, co-author Leslie Lowen (1977)
- Fear of Life (1980)
- Narcissism: Denial of the True Self (1984)
- Love, Sex and Your Heart (1988)
- The Spirituality of the Body (1990)
- Joy (1995)
- Honoring the Body: The Autobiography of Alexander Lowen, M.D. (2004)
- The Voice of the Body (2005)

== See also ==
- Esalen Institute

== Notes ==
Sources

- Lowen, Alexander (1975). Bioenergetics. London: Penguin Books.
