= Socialist Party of Great Britain breakaway groups =

The Socialist Party of Great Britain has weathered a number of internal disputes since its foundation in 1904, some of which have led to organisational breakaways.

== Background ==
Naturally, in an organisation of critical thinkers that has endured for a century, the existence of some disagreement is inevitable. Indeed, it would be true to say that a fair number of internal debates and disagreements have arisen in the Socialist Party concerning issues not covered by the Declaration of Principles and not addressed in the initial membership test – in other words, issues which are somewhat peripheral or incidental rather than core and fundamental. These issues have included the Party's exact attitude to trade unionism, its view of capitalist economic crises, and – in more recent years – whether something akin to law will exist in socialist society.

There have been some event-specific debates too – such as over the Party's precise attitude to the Spanish Civil War in 1936, to the Hungarian Uprising of 1956 and then to the movements for political democracy in the Soviet bloc states in the 1980s. On other, far fewer, occasions, small groups of Party members, sometimes concerned by the Party's pace of growth (or lack of growth in some periods) have developed ideas which have challenged the Party's basic, core positions more clearly. Having initially agreed with the Party's principles and analysis they developed a political critique which challenged these positions at a more fundamental level. But even in these instances, only a handful of disputes have been so serious that they have led to organisational breakaways, and for a political body that has seen thousands of members join over a century of activity, this is remarkable. While sometimes damaging to the Party, these have always involved very small numbers of dissidents who have either left the organisation voluntarily or who have been expelled by a Party Poll. In each case they have been more an instance of splintering than splitting. For the historical record, six splinters of the various kinds discussed above can be readily identified. They are detailed below in chronological order.

== The Socialist Propaganda League ==
The early dispute in the Socialist Party which led to the formation of the tiny Socialist Propaganda League was the product of the optimistic belief of the Party's founder members that the socialist revolution was near. A group of members around Henry Martin and Augustus Snellgrove wanted the Party to take a definitive stand on the attitude that socialists elected to Parliament or local councils would take to reform measures proposed by one or more of the capitalist parties. Martin and Snellgrove argued that socialists were required to oppose measures introduced by capitalist parties on each and every occasion. Unable to convince the rest of the membership, they resigned in 1911 and a small number led by Martin went on to found the Socialist Propaganda League. The League remained active until Martin's death in 1951.

== The Social Science Association ==
The group that formed around Harold Walsby and his ideas probably represents the most unusual breakaway from the Socialist Party in its entire history. During the Second World War this group developed a fascination with perceived impediments to mass socialist consciousness among the working class. The theory they developed was expressed by Walsby himself in his 1947 book The Domain of Ideologies and those involved in the group set up an organisation to propagate their views called the Social Science Association, which existed from 1944 until 1956, attracting a number of new recruits during the Turner Controversy (see below). It was later succeeded by the Walsby Society and the journal which emerged from it called Ideological Commentary. This survived until the death of its editor (and the former secretary of the SSA), George Walford, in 1994. As of 2007, barely a handful of its exponents still survive.

== The Movement for Social Integration ==
When membership and activity were at a peak in the period after the Second World War, a renowned Party speaker, Tony Turner, began giving lectures for the Party on what socialism would be like. The content of these lectures led him to develop a position that caused enormous controversy in the Party by the early to mid-1950s, and was elaborated by Turner and his supporters in articles in the Party's internal discussion journal of the time, Forum. A series of acrimonious disputes between the "Turnerites" and the majority of the Party culminated in a Party referendum and then a resolution being carried at the 1955 Party Conference to the effect that all members not in agreement with the Declaration of Principles be asked to resign. Turner, having survived a previous attempt to expel him, promptly did so, along with a number of other members, including Joan Lestor (later to become a Labour minister) and the psychologist John Rowan. Some of these ex-members formed a short-lived Movement for Social Integration. The impact the dispute had on the Party as a whole was almost entirely disruptive and negative, and it did not recover its vitality until the wave of radicalisation in the 1960s.

== Libertarian Communism ==
Influenced by the prevailing political climate, some members who joined in the 1960s wanted to change the emphasis of the Party's propaganda efforts towards taking a more positive attitude to industrial struggles, Claimants Unions and Tenants Associations but also to women's liberation and squatting, arguing that the Party had developed a somewhat idealist conception of how socialist consciousness arises, being divorced from the day-to-day struggles of workers. One particular group of these activists published an internal discussion bulletin, which, in 1974, converted itself into an externally oriented journal called Libertarian Communism. This was produced with the aid of non-members and supported the idea of workers' councils. It openly attacked as "Kautskyite" the Party's traditional conception of the socialist revolution being facilitated through "bourgeois democracy" and parliament. The group was eventually charged and then expelled for issuing literature that contradicted official Party policy.

== Spanner ==
In October 1987 the Guildford branch circulated an internal discussion document arguing that the growing socialist movement would have a profound economic impact on the operation of capitalism before the overthrow of the capitalist class and the formal establishment of socialism. They claimed that socialists would use their influence politically (through the legislature and local councils) to adjust patterns of state income and expenditure in ‘socialistic’ directions, including the provision of free services. Drawing inspiration from writers like André Gorz, they also claimed that socialists would be encouraging the growth of the non-monetary, voluntary sector of the economy and should be instrumental in developing support networks for co-operatives and LETS schemes. This critique of the Party's revolutionary strategy was vigorously rebutted in other circulars from branches and members and at Party conference. A small number of proponents of the Guildford perspective resigned. They went on to publish the journal Spanner, so-called because it aimed to ‘span’ opinion across the non-market socialist sector of political thought, and in recent years some have been instrumental in founding the small World In Common group.

== Socialist Studies ==
In 1991, the Camden and northwest London branches of the Party were expelled after a party-wide referendum found them to be engaged in persistent undemocratic behaviour. Some of these ex-members, comprising sixteen individuals, refused to recognise the expulsions and attempted to continue operating as the Socialist Party of Great Britain, which they claimed to have "reconstituted". The group's activity consists primarily of holding occasional propaganda meetings and publishing their journal Socialist Studies, which serves as much as a forum for socialist philosophy and agitation as it does for polemics against the original SPGB. The Socialist Studies group claims that the original SPGB has deviated from the strict anti-reformism principles it established in 1904, to the point of engaging in Trotskyist, Stalinist, and even fascist politics.
