= Athanasios Kafkalides =

Greek neurologist

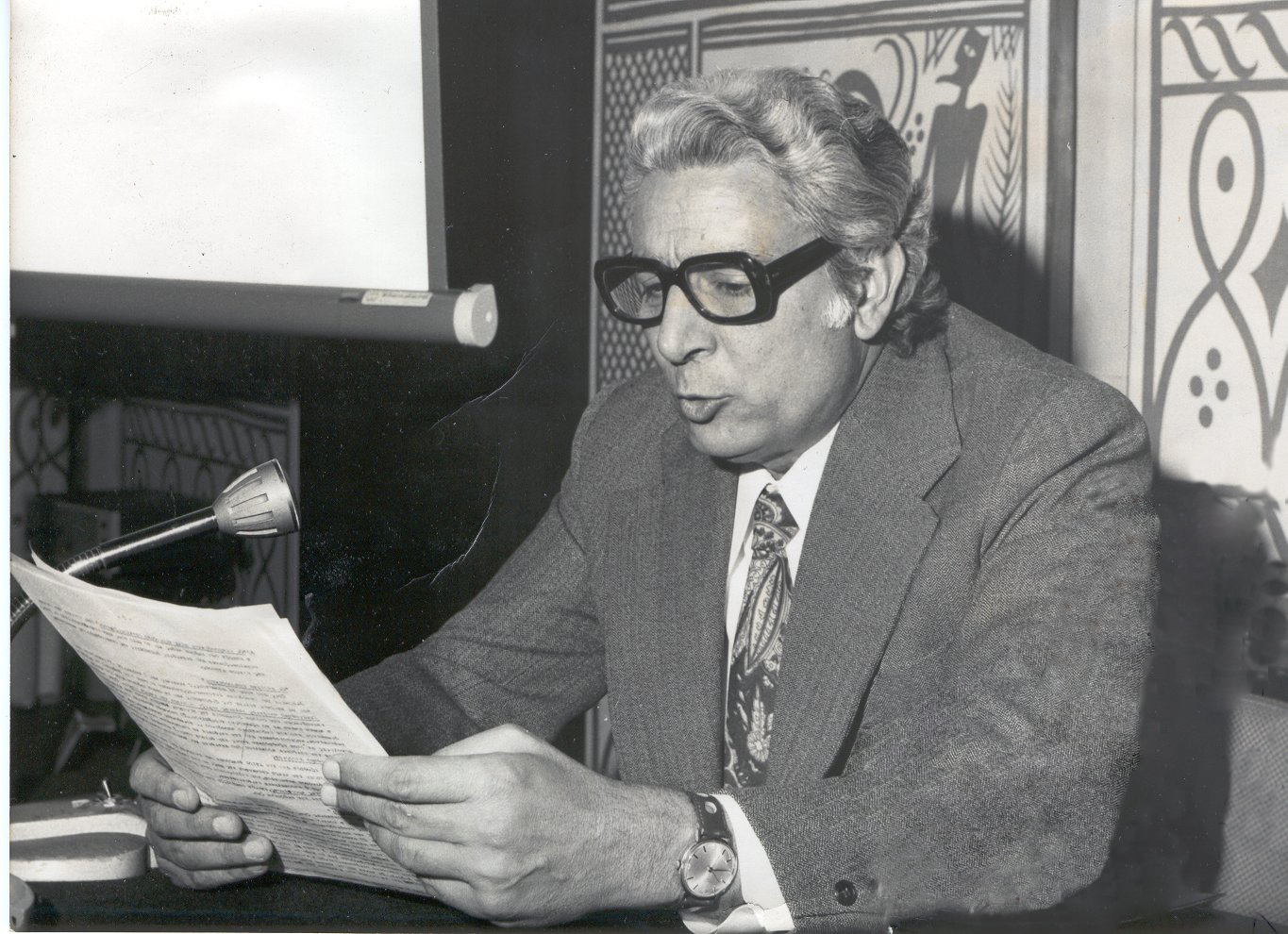

Dr. Athanassios Kafkalides was a Greek neuropsychiatrist. He was born in 1919 and he died in 1989 while in Athens. He graduated in medicine from the University of Athens and took post-graduate courses in neurology, experimental neurophysiology, neurosurgery and psychiatry at the Prince of Wales General Hospital, the Institute of Neurology in London, the Serafimer Lazarettet and the Karolinska Institutet in Stockholm, and the Eginition Hospital in Athens. From 1960 to 1987 he devoted a great deal of time to clinical research into the field of psychedelic psychotherapy, using drugs such as LSD, psilocybin and ketamine. At the IV World Congress of Psychiatry in Madrid, in 1966, he delivered a paper on the subject of intrauterine life, pioneering the field of pre- and perinatal psychology. He delivered further papers on intrauterine experiences and their repercussions at the VI International Congress of Psychotherapy (Wiesbaden, 1967), the Panhellenic Congress of Psychiatry in Salonica (1972), Athens (in 1975), and at the Congress of Preventive Psychiatry (Athens, 1979).

He was invited to Cyprus by the Pancypriot Society of Mental Health to give a series of lectures on experiences during intrauterine life and their effects on everyday life [1980]. In 1983-1984 he was invited to Australia, where he gave a series of lectures on his clinical research with ketamine. He has published several papers on LSD and its psychotherapeutic application in Annales Medico-psychologiques de Paris (1963), in Exerpta Medica (1968), and in Proceedings of the IV World Congress of Psychiatry, Madrid (1966).

His two major works, The Knowledge of the Womb, and The Power of the Womb, were first published in Greece in 1980 and 1987.

His work on prenatal and perinatal psychology resonates with the work of his contemporaries like Stanislav Grof and Frank Lake, who arrived at similar conclusions regarding how early fetal and neonatal experiences affect the human psyche and how psychedelic psychotherapy can help access those states.

== Selected bibliography ==
- Kafkalides A. (1963). Application thérapeutique de la diéthylamide de l'acide d-lysergique (Delyside ou LSD-25) sur les psychonévroses, Annales médico-psychologiques, Paris, t. 2, 121e année, no 2, pp. 191– 200.
- Kafkalides A.(1966). A Case of homosexuality treated with LSD-25. Proceedings of the IV World Congress of Psychiatry, Madrid.
- Kafkalides A.(1966). Intra-uterine security: The cause of the Oedipus and Electra Complexes in two cases treated with LSD25. paper presented at the International Congress of Psychotherapy, Wiesbaden.- see The International Journal of Prenatal and Perinatal Psychology and Medicine, V. 8, No 4, p. 427-431, December 1996.
- Kafkalides A. (1975). Causes of Sexual Conflicts - Effects on Behavior, communiqué at the VII Panhellenic Congress of Psychiatry, Athens.
- Kafkalides A. (1980). Η Γνώση της Μήτρας. Η Αυτοψυχογνωσία με Ψυχοδηλωτικά φάρμακα. Ολκός.
- Kafkalides A. (1983). The rejecting womb, Lecture given at the University of New South Wales, Sydney, December 1983.
- Kafkalides A. (1987). Η Δύναμη της Μήτρας και η «Υποκειμενική Αλήθεια». Ελεύθερος Τύπος.
- Kafkalides A. (1989). Αυτοψυχογνωσία. Εκδόσεις Οδυσσέας.
- Kafkalides A. (1998). The Power of the Womb and the “Subjective Truth”, Triklino House.
- Kafkalides A. (2005). The Knowledge of the Womb, Autopsychognosia with Psychedelic Drugs, Authorhouse, USA. ISBN 978-1418484415
