= Social Science Association =

Social Science Association may refer to:

- National Association for the Promotion of Social Science founded 1857 in the United Kingdom
- American Social Science Association founded 1865
- The Social Science Association of Harold Walsby and other socialists working on systematic ideology, active 1944 to 1956
