= John Rowan (psychologist) =

British psychologist and psychotherapist

John Rowan FBACP, FBPS
- Born: 31 March 1925; Ford, Wiltshire, England
- Died: 26 May 2018 (aged 93); London, England
- Education: Middlesex University
- Occupations: Psychologist, psychotherapist, author
- Known for: Subpersonality
- Website: www.johnrowan.org.uk

John Rowan (31 March 1925 – 26 May 2018) was an English author, counsellor, psychotherapist and clinical supervisor, known for being one of the pioneers of humanistic psychology and integrative psychotherapy. He worked in exploring transpersonal psychology, and wrote about the concept of subpersonality.

Rowan was a qualified individual and group psychotherapist (UKAHPP and UKCP), a Chartered counseling psychologist (BPS) and was an accredited counsellor (BACP). He worked in private practice in London.

He described his therapeutic approach as humanistic, existential, authentic, relational and transpersonal. He was an exponent of the idea of the dialogical self, a later development of subpersonalities theory.

== Early life ==
Rowan was born in Wiltshire on 31 March 1925. He started his life at the Old Sarum Airfield, Salisbury where his father was a squadron leader in the British Royal Air Force. Consequently, his childhood was spent in a number of different air force stations. Whilst the family was in Cairo, his brother was born in a taxi.

== Career ==
When he reached the age of eighteen in 1943, Rowan was called up to serve in the British Army. Part of his service during the Second World War was in India, where he gained formative experiences.

Rowan spent several years working in various occupations including encyclopedia sales, teaching, telecommunications, accountancy, research, and other office-based jobs.

In 1950, he became involved in the work of the Walsby Association on systematic ideology. He lived and worked with Harold Walsby in 1950, and in 1951 joined the Socialist Party of Great Britain (SPGB) in order to learn the rudiments of Marxism. He became the editor of the SPGB's internal journal, Forum but left the Party over the Turner Controversy.

After gaining a degree, Rowan built a career in market research. He held the position of Managing Director at the Bureau of Commercial Research.

In 1969, he began his group work by co-leading workshops in a pioneering group called B Now which ran from his home in Finchley, north London. In the same year Rowan joined the Association for Humanistic Psychology (AHP), which he would eventually chair. During 1971, he co-led groups at Centre 42 in Kensington, and then later in 1972 at the Kaleidoscope Centre in Swiss Cottage.

In 1975, he studied co-counselling, and practiced this method for five years. He later became a teacher of the Barefoot Psychoanalyst model.

In 1976, he published Ordinary Ecstasy. This work is a summary and guide to all the branches of Humanistic psychology. He also helped to produce the radical men's magazine Achilles Heel.

In 1978, he helped to found, with Giora Doron, the Hampstead-based Institute of Psychotherapy and Social Studies.

During 1978, Rowan became interested in Primal Integration, training with this movement's founder Bill Swartley. Rowan then offered this therapy as part of his practice.

In 1980, Rowan helped to found the Association for Humanistic Psychology Practitioners, later to be known as the UK Association of Humanistic Psychology Practitioners.

In 1989, Rowan co-founded the Serpent Institute with Jocelyn Chaplin. Both taught humanistic and psychodynamic theories and practices.

On the closure of this institute four years later, he joined the Minster Centre, where he worked for ten years. Whilst there he trained psychotherapists, lead seminars, experiential training groups and supervision groups. He left the Centre in 2004, and worked in private practice, as well as provided master classes and workshops.

== Education ==
During childhood, Rowan went to a number of different schools as a consequence of his father's career in the British Royal Air Force. One such was King's School, Chester, where he was in the class of 1939.

In the 1950s, Rowan gained a London University diploma in sociology, and was awarded a joint honours degree in philosophy and psychology from Birkbeck College.

From 1970–79, Rowan studied with a variety of practitioners including John Adams, James Elliott, Bernard Gunther, Paul Lowe, Elizabeth Mintz, Al and Diane Pesso, John Pierrakos, Will Schutz, Julian Silverman, Jay Stattman, and Denny Yuson.

In 2006, he was awarded a Ph.D in transpersonal psychology from Middlesex University.

== Honours ==
John Rowan was a Fellow of the British Psychological Society (member of the Psychotherapy Section, the Counselling Psychology Division, the Transpersonal Psychology Section, and the Consciousness and Experience Section). He was also a Fellow of the British Association for Counselling and Psychotherapy (BACP). As a founding member of the UK Association of Humanistic Psychology Practitioners, he was named an Honorary Life Member. He was an Honorary Fellow of the United Kingdom Council for Psychotherapy and was a past member of its governing board, representing the Humanistic and Integrative Section.

== Personal life ==
Rowan and his wife Sue lived in North Chingford, London. He had four children and four grandchildren from a previous marriage that ended in divorce in 1978.

== Publications ==
=== Author ===
- The Science of You (Psychological Aspects of Society Book 1) (Davis-Poynter 1973)
- The Social Individual (Psychological Aspects of Society Book 2) (Davis-Poynter 1973)
- The Power of the Group (Psychological Aspects of Society Book 3) (Davis-Poynter 1976)
- Ordinary Ecstasy: Humanistic Psychology in Action (Routledge and Kegan Paul 1976)
- The Reality Game:A Guide to Humanistic Counseling and Psychotherapy (Routledge and Kegan Paul 1976)
- The Structured Crowd (Psychological Aspects of Society Book 4) (Davis-Poynter 1978)
- A Guide To Humanistic Psychology (Association for Humanistic Psychology in Britain 1987)
- The Horned God (Routledge & Kegan Paul 1987)
- Subpersonalities: The people Inside Us (Routledge 1990)
- Breakthroughs and Integration in Psychotherapy (Whurr 1992)
- Discover Your Subpersonalities: Our Inner World and the People In It (Routledge 1993)
- The Transpersonal: Spirituality in Psychotherapy and Counselling (Routledge 1993)
- Healing the Male Psyche: Therapy as Initiation (Routledge 1997)
- The Therapist's Use of Self with Michael Jacobs (Open University Press 2002)
- The Future of Training in Psychotherapy and Counselling: Instrumental, Relational and Transpersonal Perspectives (Routledge 2005)
- Personification: Using the Dialogical Self in Psychotherapy and Counselling (Routledge 2010)

=== Editor ===
- Human Inquiry: A Sourcebook of New Paradigm Research with Peter Reason (Wiley 1976)
- Innovative Therapy in Britain with Windy Dryden (Wiley 1988)
- The Plural Self: Multiplicity in Everyday Life with Mick Cooper (SAGE 1998)

He was on the Editorial Board of the following periodicals.

- Self & Society: An International Journal for Humanistic Psychology; link to journal
- The Transpersonal Psychology Review; link to journal
- Counseling Psychology Review; link to journal
- Journal of Humanistic Psychology; link to journal

=== Papers ===
- List of papers: John Rowan. "John Rowan: Ph.D: Independent Researcher". ResearchGate. Archived from the original on 9 June 2018.

== See also ==
- Personification
