= Prenatal memory =

Development of human memory

Prenatal memory, also called fetal memory, is important for the development of memory in humans. Many factors can impair fetal memory and its functions, primarily maternal actions. There are multiple techniques available not only to demonstrate the existence of fetal memory but to measure it. Fetal memory is vulnerable to certain diseases so much so that exposure can permanently damage the development of the fetus and even terminate the pregnancy by aborting the fetus. Maternal nutrition and the avoidance of drugs, alcohol and other substances during all nine months of pregnancy (especially the critical period when the nervous system is developing) is important to the development of the fetus and its memory systems. The use of certain substances can entail long-term permanent effects on the fetus that can carry on throughout their lifespan.

== Background information and functions ==
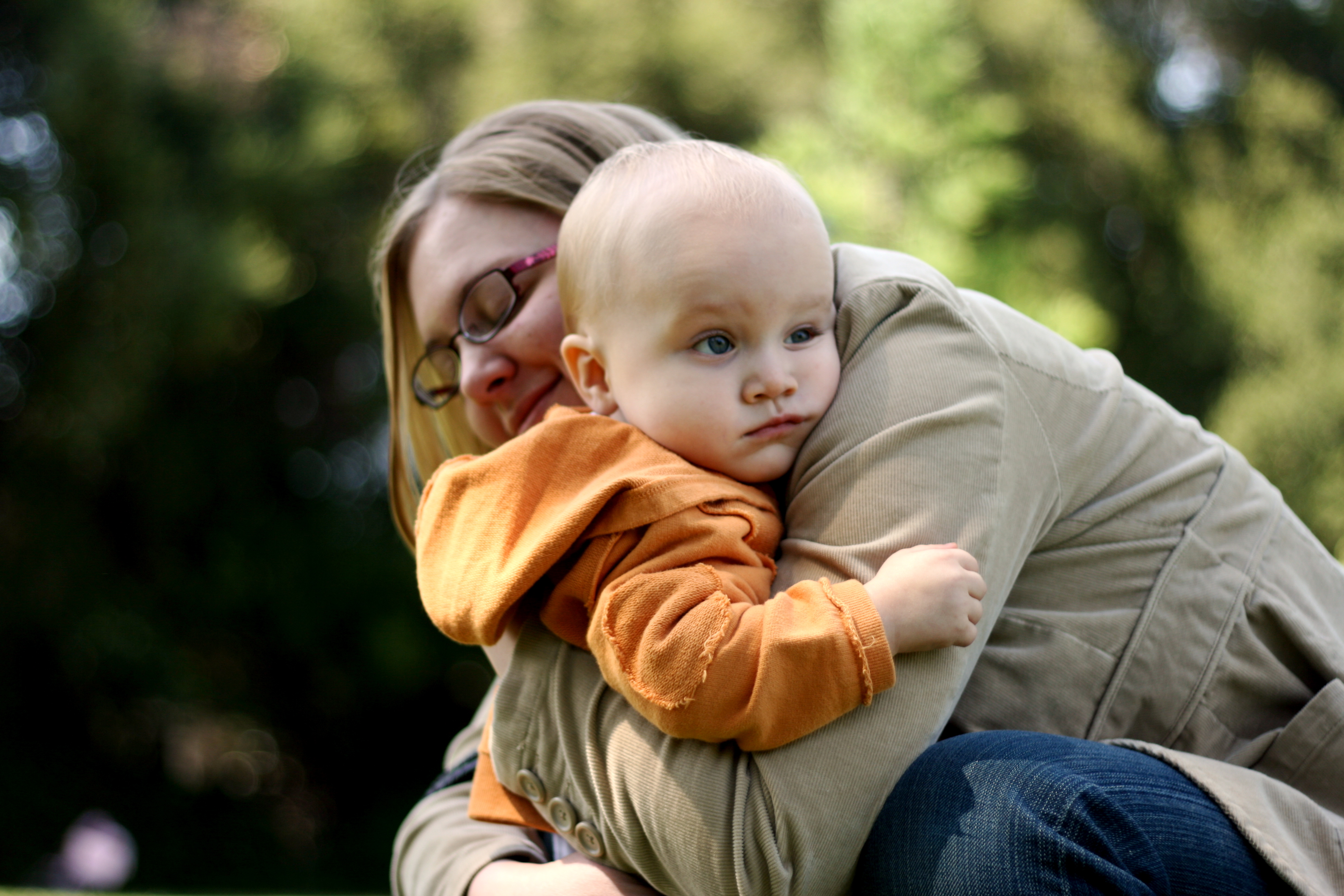
Fetal memory is integral to mother-infant attachment.

There is some evidence that fetal memory may begin within the second trimester after conception. Substantial evidence for fetal memories has been found at around 30 weeks after conception. Fetal memory is important for parental recognition, and facilitates the bond between child and parents. One of the most important types of memory is that which stores information contributing to the maternal bond between infant and mother. This form of memory is important for a type of development known as attachment. Fetal memory is thus critical to the survival of the fetus both prenatally (in the womb) and after birth as an infant.

=== Development ===
The Central Nervous System (CNS) and memory in the fetus develop from the ectoderm following fertilization via a process called neurulation. The ectoderm is the outermost layer of the embryo. This happens towards the end of the third week of gestation (time period when the embryo is carried in the woman's uterus) and ends with the start of the development of the neural tube, an important structure crucial to development of the central nervous system. Some evidence suggests memory is actually responsible for carrying out the development of the CNS during neurulation. However, much more research needs to be done on this. Fetal memory and brain development can be impaired by a number of maternal implications. Rubella, intrauterine hypoxia and hypothyroidism are some of the more researched examples. Alcohol and other substances such as hard drugs can affect this process as well.

=== Functions ===
Once neurulation is complete and has given rise to the nervous system, fetal memory becomes responsible for a variety of tasks. One of its main functions at this point is to control breathing in the fetus. Also noted was its ability to control eye movement and coordination during all nine months of development. There is evidence that these are practiced in the womb and carried out similarly after birth. Learning language as an infant also requires fetal memory. It is now known that the mother's voice is clearly heard from inside the womb and that the fetus can differentiate speech sounds, particularly the phonemes (a single segment of sound) in speech. This is evident in the baby when born, showing many signs of early language comprehension. It has also been shown that infants prefer their mother's native language after being exposed to it in the womb. Evidence also exists that the infant, when born, prefers its mother's smell from having memorized her scent as a fetus. Memory is critical for the recognition process that takes place between the mother and infant through breastfeeding. Breast milk contains contents recognizable by the infant that they were exposed to through amniotic fluid (fluid that encompasses the fetus and is responsible for its nutrition in the womb) in the fetal stage. Since the baby is so dependent upon the mother, maternal nutrition also plays a large role in the infant developing healthy brain functioning; including memory function, which the infant cannot live without. Thus, fetal memory is critical to the survival and healthy development of the infant before and after birth. Many of these functions are measured through methods such as classical conditioning, habituation and exposure learning, being the most popular.

== Measurement techniques ==
There are considered to be three paradigms used to investigate fetal learning and memory. They are: classical conditioning, habituation and exposure learning.

=== Classical conditioning ===
Classical conditioning is described as the pairing of a conditioned stimulus (CS) (such as a vibration) with an unconditioned stimulus (US) (such as a loud noise) to evoke a conditioned response (CR) (agitation). In this pairing, the vibration will be presented immediately followed by a loud noise. Initially, the presentation of the loud noise (US) would cause the unconditioned response (UR) (natural agitation) without prior classical conditioning. However, the continuous pairing of the loud noise (US) with the vibration (CS) converts the unconditioned response (UR) into a (CR) as the fetus learns that the presentation of a vibration will be followed by a loud noise. Eventually, the fetus will respond to the vibration (CS) without being exposed to the loud noise (US); this is when conditioning has occurred. Conditioning has been demonstrated in as few as 12-15 pairings of the vibration (CS) with the loud noise (US) in fetuses as early as 32 weeks of gestation. Another study replicated these findings.

Fetuses between 32 and 39 weeks gestation were presented a pure tone (CS), which was paired with a vibroacoustic stimulus (US). A vibroacoustic stimulus is a low bass sound frequency that is felt by the fetus as a mechanical vibration. After 10-20 pairings, approximately 50% of the fetuses showed successful conditioning, unrelated to age or sex of the fetus. It is suggested that poorly prepared experimental set up, inaccurate or inappropriate response measures and unsuitable stimuli could all contribute to failed conditioning, as opposed to lack of fetal memory. Reasons for some fetuses demonstrating conditioning, while others do not, remains undetermined.

=== Habituation ===
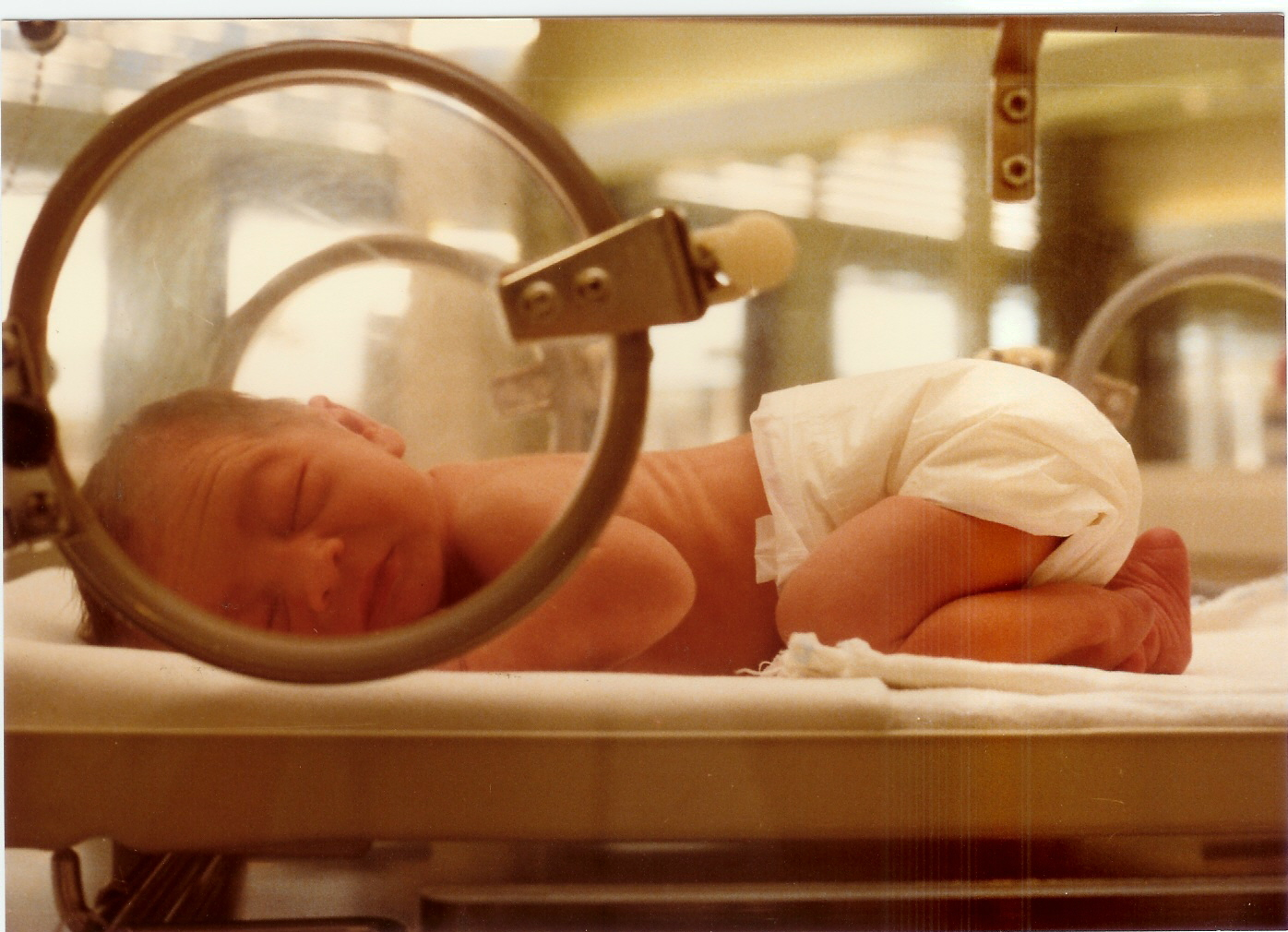
Evidence shows that newborns in the neonatal period, like above, are habituated to auditory stimuli experienced while a fetus.

The second paradigm, habituation, is one of the most successful ways of investigating fetal memory. Habituation has been demonstrated in fetuses as early as 22 weeks and corresponds to the onset of fetal auditory abilities. Both auditory and vibroacoustic stimulation have been used in habituation. Vibroacoustic stimulation is a technique involving the repetitive stimulation of the fetus, by applying a vibroacoustic stimulus (in predetermined intervals) to the abdomen of the mother. The movement and reaction of the fetus, in response to the stimulus, is recorded using ultrasound technology. This process is repeated until habituation, defined as a lack of response to the stimulus by the fetus, is reached. Stimulation trials continue into the neonatal period (first 28 days after birth) by presenting the same auditory stimulus, to test whether or not the fetus has memory of the stimulation events. A scientific control group of babies in the neonatal period, having not been exposed to the stimulus as a fetus, are used in neonatal trials to serve as a comparison.

Results from another recent study suggest that fetuses were able to form both short and long-term memories. This conclusion was drawn from the fact that habituation rates (number of stimuli needed to habituate) were higher in babies in the neonatal stage that had not previously undergone fetal stimulations when compared to those who had: therefore demonstrating the memory of the stimulus in its fetal stage being carried into the neonatal stage.

=== Exposure learning ===
The final experimental technique used to investigate fetal learning and memory is exposure learning. This technique allows the experimenter a lot of control over the presentation of the stimulus and following testing. Exposure learning is the act of presenting the fetus with a stimulus, such as a television theme tune, repeatedly while in the womb and then testing recognition (learning) of that tune after birth. One experiment was conducted where fetuses were exposed to the television theme tune from the show "Neighbours" while in the womb. In the first condition of the experiment, newborns age 2–4 days who were exposed to the tune while in the womb were presented with the tune after birth. Upon hearing the tune, these newborns showed physiological changes, such as a decrease in heart rate. This observed change did not happen with unfamiliar tunes, or to newborns that were not exposed to the tune in the womb; so the tune had to be learned in the womb. Recognition of the tune was strong 2–4 days after birth, however, diminished after the age of 21 days without repeated exposure.

A second exposure learning experiment, using the television theme tune, was conducted to determine when learning and memory could first take place in utero. It was determined that by 30–37 weeks of gestation, fetuses previously exposed to the theme tune were more active when presented with the tune than those who had no previous experience with the tune. This demonstrates that stimulus recognition begins no earlier than 30 weeks of gestation.

=== Implications ===
Overall, studies indicate that there is an ability for fetal learning and memory, and through classical conditioning, habituation and exposure learning that memory can be measured. Certain periods in fetal development allow for different learning and memory abilities, which should be taken into consideration when determining if fetal memory exists. Auditory stimuli presented in the womb can be retained and recognized (learned) into the days following birth and that learning is specific to familiar auditory stimuli. Measuring learning and memory in the fetus has only been discussed in terms of healthy pregnancies; however, many factors such as disease affect these delicate processes.

== Diseases and conditions affecting fetal memory ==
Much research and literature has shown that endocrine, neurological and most other diseases a mother or father carries can have adverse effects on a fetus's development. The majority of the research done regarding fetal brain development, and consequently its memory after birth, has focused on one condition or state and two main diseases: intrauterine hypoxia, hypothyroidism and rubella.

=== Intrauterine hypoxia ===
The frontal lobe (highlighted in red) is one part of the fetus's brain that can be negatively affected by decreased levels of oxygen due to intrauterine hypoxia.

Intrauterine hypoxia is a condition or state caused by insufficient oxygen levels reaching a fetus during gestation, having detrimental effects on the development of its central nervous system (CNS). In many cases, intrauterine hypoxia results in the death of the fetus. Commonly known, the CNS is vital to the communication and response transmissions between the brain and all of the body parts within an organism. Due to dysfunction in this system such things as cognitive functioning and attention capacity are impeded, resulting in a poor ability to decode or encode information and form memories. It has also been discovered that lower levels of oxygen reaching the developing fetus may, in fact, decrease the amount of grey matter produced within its brain and increase the amount of sulcal (referring to a sulcus: a fissure within the surface of the brain) cerebrospinal fluid (CSF); importantly in the frontal lobe and temporal lobe, which are critical memory centers. The later point regarding sulcal CSF has been linked to schizophrenia (a mental disorder affecting thought processes). Grey matter is a large component of the CNS and is related to: muscle control, sensory perceptions, memory, emotions and speech; please follow this link for more information regarding the different brain structures and their effects on human function.

=== Hypothyroidism ===
Hypothyroidism is a disease that may have severe, adverse effects on the brain development in a fetus. These problems are often caused by a "passing-down" from the mother or from an external neurotoxin causing impaired cognitive ability and, in extreme cases, mental retardation.

Hypothyroidism is usually caused by an iodine deficiency that results in the under production of thyroid hormones or an underdeveloped thyroid gland with similar effects. Thyroid hormone release is regulated by a stimulating hormone called thyrotropin (TSH) in a normal functioning person. In abnormal cases when there are lowered levels of thyroid hormone, TSH levels increase to compensate, thus doctors and medical researchers can measure TSH levels to predict hypothyroidism. If interested, a good explanation of this process and the consequences of abnormal levels of TSH can be found under this link. Reduced levels of thyroid hormones have many physical and cognitive implications for a fetus once fully developed. Because of ethical reasons, most research has been carried out on rats and other mammals. However, in the hypothyroid rat brain, numerous malformations were found: reduced myelin of neurons in the CNS, deficiency of neurons in the cerebral cortex, the visual cortex and auditory cortex, hippocampus and cerebellum, which relate to general learning and motor skill acquisition.

=== Rubella ===
Rubella, synonymous with German measles, is a disease caused by a virus with the same name and is highly contagious. It is often combated using preventative measures, typically through vaccination. For children and adults it can be overcome quite easily once vaccinated, however, if the fetus is exposed to the virus, especially during the first trimester (the first three months of pregnancy), major implications can occur.

== Fetal nutrition and memory ==
Fetal nutrition has implications for both the short term and long-term development of the brain. Due to ethical reasons, studies, which may result in diminished physical functioning or short/long-term damage, are generally done on animals before being deemed safe for human trials.

There are two points in rodent brain development during which treatment with choline, a neurotransmitter, produces lifelong enhancement of spatial memory.

Choline, a neurotransmitter important for spatial memory.

The first point is at 12–17 days into embryo development, and the second is between 16 and 30 days after the rat has been born. Baby rats, from mothers fed a diet lacking in choline during these two periods of pregnancy, have poorer memory function than baby rats from mothers who received choline. Choline, when given during these critical periods, causes a major improvement in memory performance when rats are being trained in a maze. Even in older rats, these memory changes persist and can be used to easily identify which rats came from mothers that received enough choline. Supplementation with choline appears to reduce the speed at which memory declines with age. Choline before pregnancy is also related to changes in the birth, death, and migration of cells in the hippocampus during the development of the baby rats in the womb. Choline is also associated with the different location and shape of neurons involved in memory storage within the brain.

In another study using rats, it was found that the size of the hippocampus (the central region in memory functioning) was affected by protein malnutrition. More specifically, only the CA1 region of the hippocampus seemed to demonstrate a significant reduction in size. The CA1 subsection of the hippocampus was 20% smaller in offspring from mothers who were fed a protein deficient diet while pregnant. Because the region of the hippocampus affected by protein malnutrition is so specific, global hippocampal function is not impaired, but rather just the function that would appear to be associated with the CA1. Rats with the CA1 volume deficit were found to perform poorly in a tasks requiring behavioural inhibition and accurate response timing.

As both of these studies have only been done on rats, it is still unknown for certain whether the same effects of choline would be seen in humans. Further research in this area is needed.

== Longitudinal memory effects of prenatal drug exposure ==
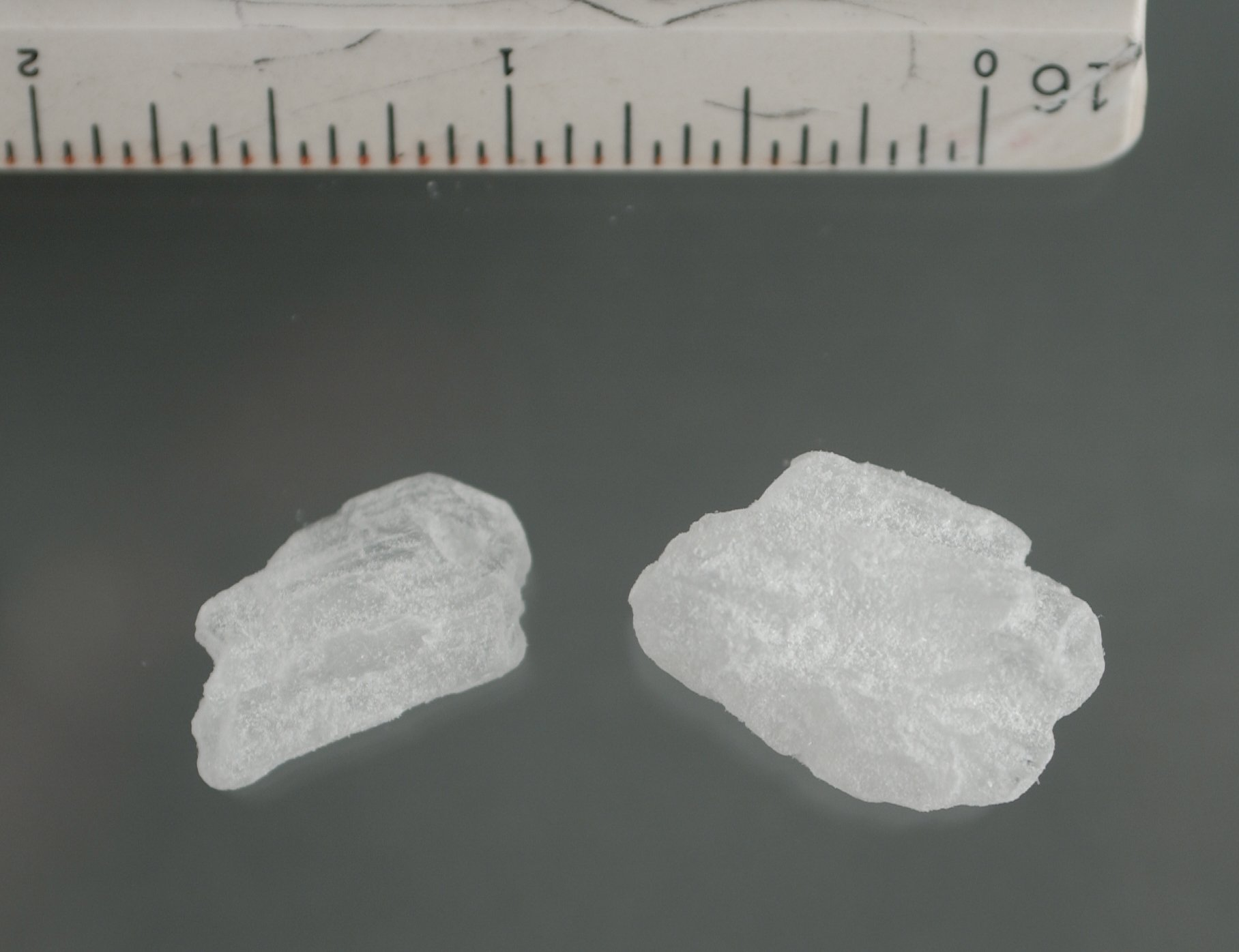
Crystal Methamphetamine is an example of a recreational drug that can have serious negative consequences on fetal memory development if used during pregnancy.

Similarly to nutritional intake, drugs consumed by the mother during pregnancy can affect the brain development of her fetus. There has been a great deal of research concerned with the damaging effects of prenatal drug use, and how exactly this use impairs future memory functioning of the child. Research has focused on a variety of recreational drugs, primarily alcohol, cocaine, heroin, and methamphetamine.

=== Pregnancy category ===
Most drugs are rated by the Food and Drug Administration to a pregnancy category, which is a government assessment of the risks to the fetus that drug use by the mother incurs. The pregnancy category levels (from least to most dangerous) are A, B, C, D and X and are described as follows:

- Category A: "Adequate and well-controlled studies have failed to demonstrate a risk to the fetus in the first trimester of pregnancy (and there is no evidence of risk in later trimesters)"
- Category B: "Animal reproduction studies have failed to demonstrate a risk to the fetus and there are no adequate and well-controlled studies in pregnant women"
- Category C: "Animal reproduction studies have shown an adverse effect on the fetus and there are no adequate and well-controlled studies in humans, but potential benefits may warrant use of the drug in pregnant women despite potential risks"
- Category D: "There is positive evidence of human fetal risk based on adverse reaction data from investigational or marketing experience or studies in humans, but potential benefits may warrant use of the drug in pregnant women despite potential risks"
- Category X: "Studies in animals or humans have demonstrated fetal abnormalities and/or there is positive evidence of human fetal risk based on adverse reaction data from investigational or marketing experience, and the risks involved in use of the drug in pregnant women clearly outweigh potential benefits"

=== Alcohol ===
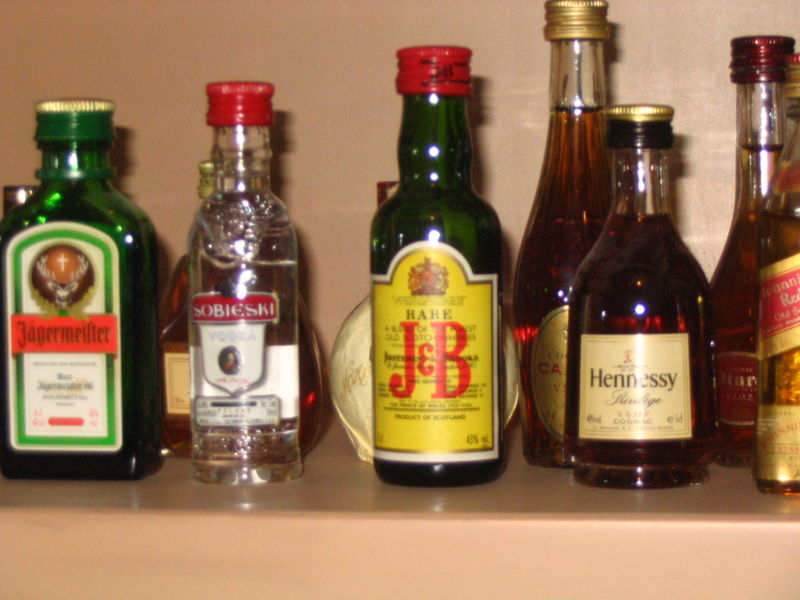
Alcoholic beverages are the most commonly abused recreational drug and include beer, wine and spirits.

Alcohol is the most widely used of these drugs, and for that reason, the majority research on prenatal drug use has been focused on it. Research shows that prenatal exposure to alcohol can have many negative consequences, and is significantly associated with memory problems, attention problems and decreased cognitive functioning (mental processes involved in memory, perception, thinking etc.) for the offspring later in life. Also, it can lead to the development of alcohol-related problems in later years, such as alcohol dependence.

One study compared data about maternal drinking during pregnancy (alcohol consumption by the pregnant mother), to observations gathered about the offspring many years after birth. The mother's alcoholic drinking levels during mid pregnancy were measured via self-report measures (a questionnaire). In this longitudinal study (a study which measures participant changes over time through repeated measures), the offspring also reported their drinking habits at 21 years of age, and completed the Alcohol Dependence Scale (a self-report questionnaire). The results suggested that there is a significant correlation between prenatal alcohol exposure and the presence of dangerous alcohol problems at age 21. Episodic drinking (multiple drinks during drinking occasions) by the mother significantly increased subsequent Alcohol Dependence scores for their children.

One of the items on the Alcohol Dependence scale most positively related to their prenatal alcohol exposure includes "blacking out". Blackouts are alcohol-related amnesia, occurring when long-term memory creation is impaired during a drinking episode, resulting in an inability to remember. The frequency of blackouts in young adults while drinking is strongly related to prenatal alcohol exposure; those exposed to alcohol as a fetus are more vulnerable to experiencing blackouts as an adult. Prenatal alcohol exposure can also lead to decreased problem solving skills and/or attention deficits. Attention deficits result in an inability to maintain focus on one task for a length of time, and being prone to distraction.

Another study examined the relationship between prenatal alcohol exposure and executive functioning performance through a number of tests. Executive functions are a group of processes that serve to regulate more basic brain functions such as memory, motor skills and attention. Patients who had been exposed prenatally to alcohol show decreased ability to hold and manipulate information in working memory (the memory system that is used to keep things in mind during complex tasks). Those with Fetal Alcohol Syndrome (FAS) and Fetal Alcohol Effects (FAE) (defects caused by a mother's alcohol consumption during pregnancy), have poor problem solving skills compared to control participants (participants that do not have either FAS or FAE). The memory tests used to assess the participants in this study included the following:

- Consonant Trigrams Test (CTT) – a measure of working memory. The participant attempts to remember three consonants, while having to count backwards by three through various delays.
- Digit Span – another measure of working memory. The participant is given a set of numbers and is asked to recount as many as possibly afterwards.
- California Verbal Learning Test (CVLT) – tests for lists which are learned over repeated trials.

Prenatal alcohol exposure directly affects the ability to switch tasks, maintain attention as well as keep and manipulate information in working memory despite distraction. Therefore, in almost all cases in this study, the patients with FAS or FAE had inferior performance on the tests when compared to the control group. Patterns show that longitudinal memory effects of prenatal alcohol exposure manifest themselves both directly and also indirectly through lower IQ.

=== Cocaine ===
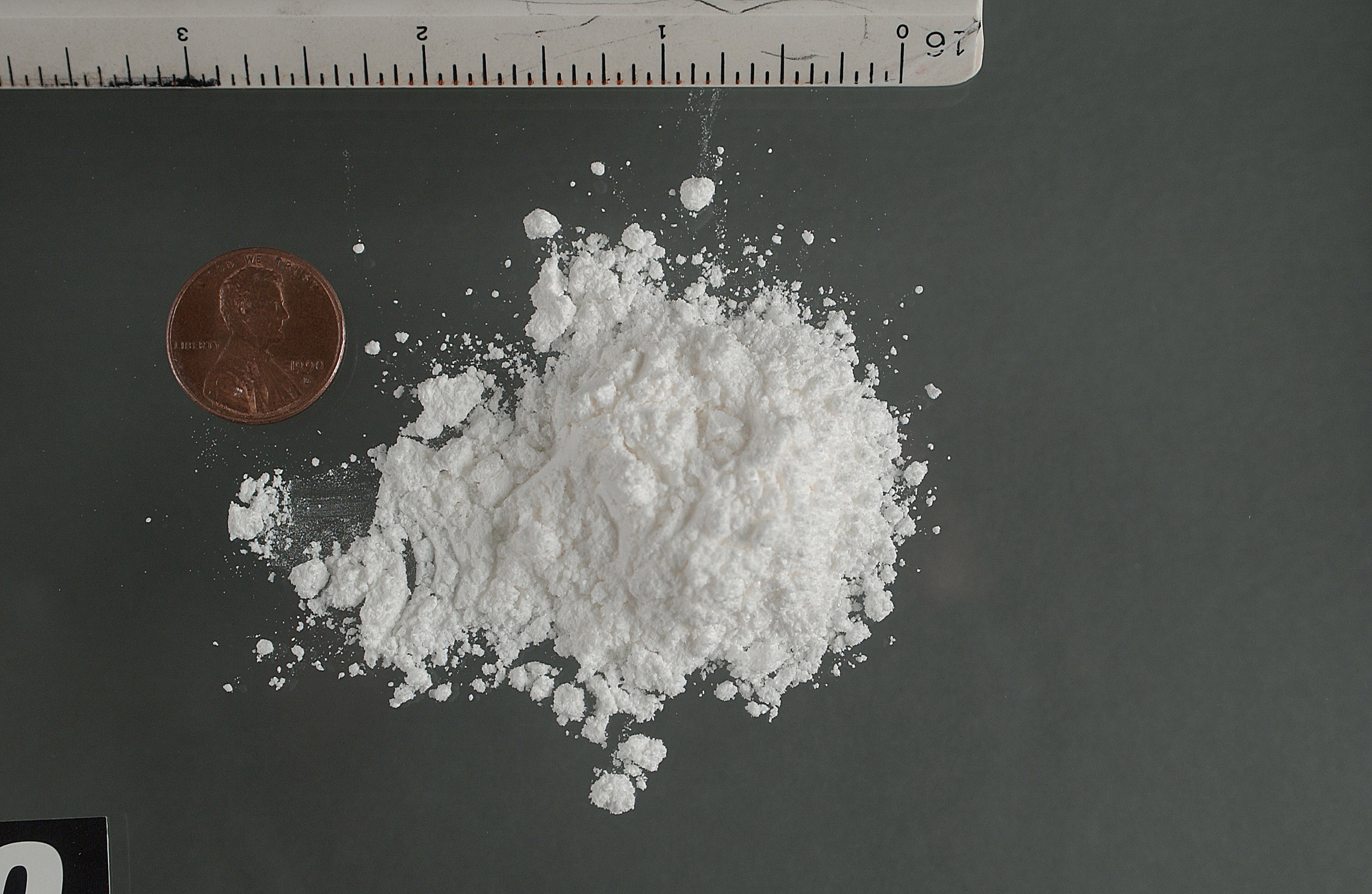
Cocaine.

Cocaine is an addictive stimulant, and although there is not a comparable academic research base to alcohol, there are a fair number of studies which show adverse effects to memory performance after prenatal exposure. The pregnancy category level of cocaine is C, as described above.

Prenatal exposure to cocaine has also been linked to decreased cognitive functioning in school aged children, including lower scores in short-term memory assessments. Short-term memory is the memory system responsible for holding information in an easily accessible state for a short period of time. One particular study examined the effects of prenatal cocaine exposure, among other factors, on cognitive ability in children. In this specific assessment, the Stanford-Binet IV Test, an IQ test, was given to children who were exposed to cocaine in utero (before birth) as well as a control group of children (not exposed to cocaine in utero). Overall, those children who were exposed to cocaine during pregnancy had lower scores on the Short Term Memory scale than unexposed children at all age levels, especially boys. Cocaine exposure also predicted lower IQ scores in general. Exposing prenatal offspring to cocaine can cause irreversible damage and increase developmental risks.

A review of 42 follow up studies of prenatal drug exposed children suggests that cocaine affects the areas concerned with behavior problems, attention, language and cognition for children tested between 4 and 13 years of age. Specifically, short-term memory, visual spatial short-term memory (short-term memory for visual information specifically) and working memory were negatively affected in a number of studies.

=== Heroin ===
Prenatal exposure research is less abundant for opiates, such as heroin. Despite this, heroin is given a pregnancy risk level of X, the highest rating. One study suggested that children exposed to prenatal heroin performed worse in memory subscales of the McCarthy Scales. In other words, youth who had been prenatally exposed to heroin performed worse on general cognitive tasks, including those associated with memory.

=== Methamphetamine ===
The hippocampus (red), which is vital to attention and verbal memory, has been shown to be a reduced in size in patients with prenatal methamphetamine exposure.

Methamphetamine is another stimulant that has been demonstrated to have negative effects on the offspring of a pregnant woman, and is considered a level C pregnancy category drug.One study attempted to determine the neurotoxic effects (harm to nerve cells) of prenatal methamphetamine exposure on brain development, as well as on cognitive functioning. Children exposed to methamphetamine in utero scored lower on key measures of memory performance, including attention, verbal memory and long term spatial memory.

The reduced size of brain structures associated with memory and attention was also noted through magnetic resonance imaging (MRI), a process used to produce images of the brain for observation. For example, those with prenatal methamphetamine exposure had, on average, a smaller hippocampus (a brain structure involved in many things, including memory) than control participants. This reduction in size was correlated with poorer sustained attention (decreased ability to focus on a single task for a period of time) and delayed verbal memory (memory of words read or heard). The conclusion from this study is that prenatal methamphetamine exposure can be neurotoxic to the developing fetus brain.

== See also ==
- Prenatal development
- Prenatal and perinatal psychology
