= Primal Integration =

Primal Integration (PI) is a form of personal growth work first formulated by the American Bill Swartley in the mid-1970s. Unlike many other approaches known as psychotherapy, it puts the emphasis on an individual's self-directed exploration of their own psyche assisted by facilitators who serve the individual and are responsible for their safety. It uses an educational model and is considered to be part of humanistic psychology. It has a different approach to the better known Primal therapy formulated by Arthur Janov and is not related to it except in the broadest sense by its name and by its acceptance of the significance of early experiences.

== Description ==
During the late 1970s Swartley travelled in Europe and was instrumental in setting up centres for Primal Integration in Italy and Britain. Centres also exist in Canada and the USA.

Its theoretical basis emphasizes early trauma in shaping an individual's consciousness. It claims that trauma that takes place before, during and soon after birth has strong influences on how someone interprets and copes with their future life. These early preverbal traumata, as well as later difficult childhood experiences, can only be fully recognized by re-living the experience at an emotional level. This emotional expression of deep memory is called a "primal". Its expression begins the process of integration of the experience into the personality of the individual and the re-adjustment of his or her world view. The human mind as a self healing organic process constantly draws the individual's attention to potential situations in which these traumata can be relived and integrated. The individual unconsciously blocks these pathways in order to function in everyday life. The provision of a safe environment is enough to allow the paths to be approached. A safe environment is created through the presence of skilled facilitators and the "Stop I Mean It" rule which allows a participant to bring any activity to an immediate halt at any time.

Primal Integration was developed in parallel to the Primal therapy of Arthur Janov and shares some similarities with it, as well as the name "Primal". There is a difference in the theoretical approach which comes down to the use of a medical model in Janov's work and a holistic or educational model in PI. The early practitioners of Primal Integration founded the International Primal Association (IPA), which had a court struggle with Janov in 1974 when he claimed the word "Primal" as his own and tried to prevent them using it in their name. The court found against Janov but at great financial cost to the IPA.

Since those early years, the IPA and Primal Integration practitioners have facilitated thousands of individuals on their healing path and have brought their theory and philosophy to countries throughout the world. The IPA's journals, website, conventions, retreats and newsletters have been promoting Primal for over 40 years.

== See also ==
- Primal therapy
- Pre- and perinatal psychology
- Attachment theory
- Humanistic psychology

== Bibliography ==
- J. Rowan; W. Dryden, eds. (1988). Innovative Therapy in Britain. Buckingham, England: Open University Press. pp. 12–38.
- Mowbray, Richard; Brown, Juliana (1994). "2 - Primal Integration". In Jones, David (ed.). Innovative Therapy: A Handbook. Open University Press (published September 1994). ISBN 0-335-19139-8. ASIN 0335191398.
- Grof, Stanislav (1975). Realms Of The Human Unconscious: Observations From LSD Research. Condor Books. ISBN 0-285-64882-9.
- Verny, Thomas; John Kelly (1981). The Secret Life of the Unborn Child. N.Y.: Delta Books. ISBN 0-7515-1003-3.
- Lake, Frank (1980). Studies in Constricted Confusion. Oxford, UK: Clinical Theology Association.
- Janov, Arthur (1970). The Primal Scream. N.Y.: Putnam. ISBN 0-7474-1218-9.
