= Prenatal development =

Process in which an embryo and later fetus develops during gestation

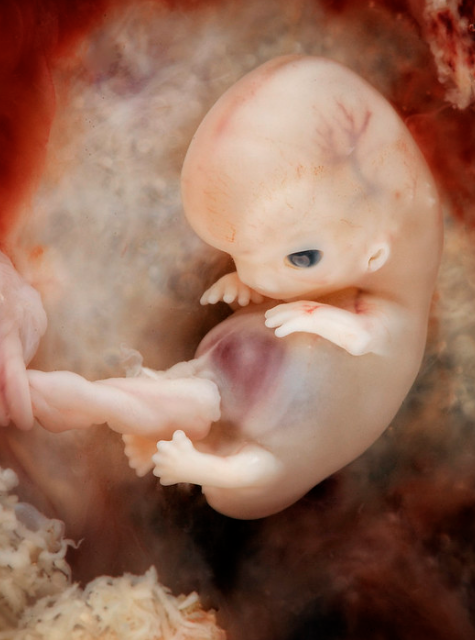
Human embryo at 7-8 weeks from conception

Prenatal development (from Latin natalis 'relating to birth') involves the development of the embryo and of the fetus during a viviparous animal's gestation. Prenatal development starts with fertilization, in the germinal stage of embryonic development, and continues in fetal development until birth. The term "prenate" is used to describe an unborn offspring at any stage of gestation.

In human pregnancy, prenatal development is also called antenatal development. The development of the human embryo follows fertilization, and continues as fetal development. By the end of the tenth week of gestational age, the embryo has acquired its basic form and is referred to as a fetus. The next period is that of fetal development where many organs become fully developed. This fetal period is described both topically (by organ) and chronologically (by time) with major occurrences being listed by gestational age.

The very early stages of embryonic development are the same in all mammals, but later stages of development, and the length of gestation varies.

== Terminology ==
In the human:

Stages during pregnancy. Embryonic development is marked in green. Weeks and months are numbered by gestation.

Different terms are used to describe prenatal development, meaning development before birth. A term with the same meaning is the "antepartum" (from Latin ante "before" and parere "to give birth") Sometimes "antepartum" is however used to denote the period between the 24th/26th week of gestational age until birth, for example in antepartum hemorrhage.

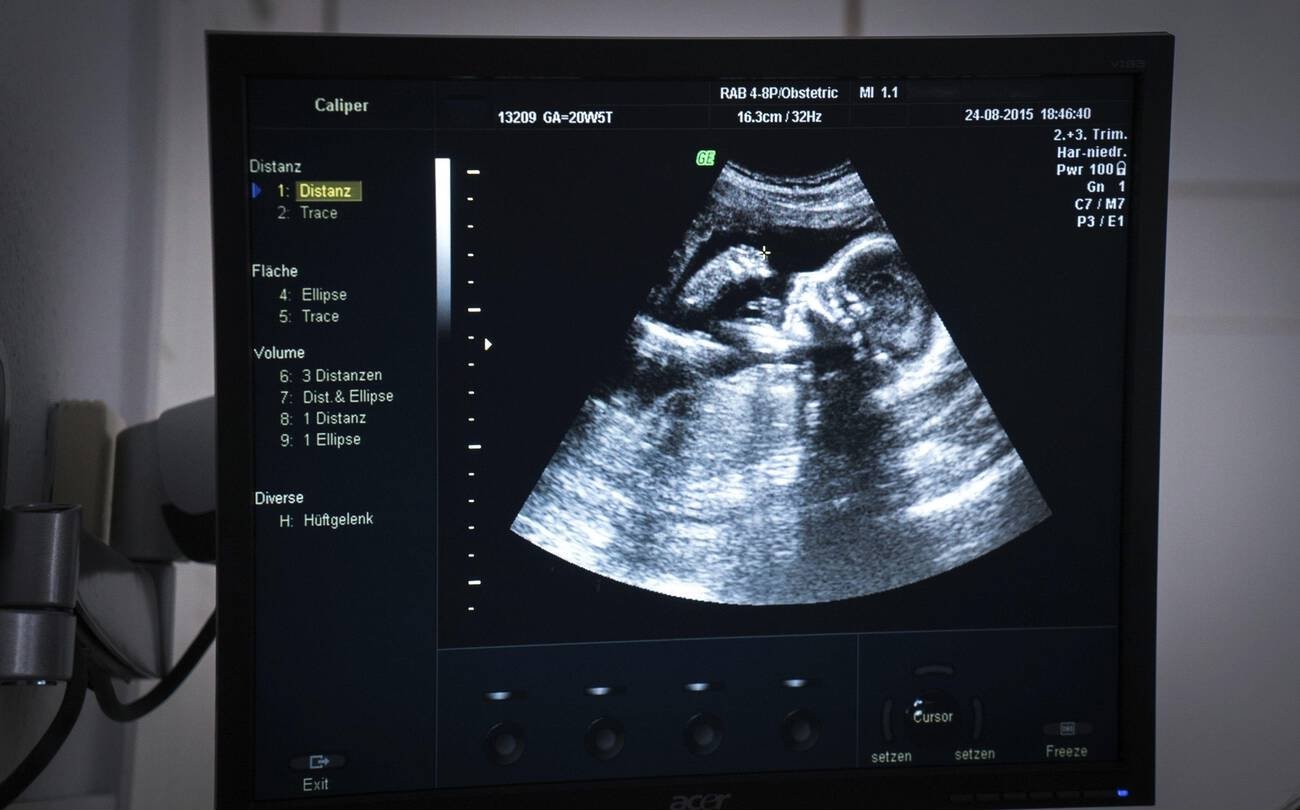
An obstetric ultrasound monitor displaying a detailed sagittal profile view of a human fetus at 20 weeks and 5 days of gestational age.

The perinatal period (from Greek peri, "about, around" and Latin nasci "to be born") is "around the time of birth". In developed countries and at facilities where expert neonatal care is available, it is considered from 22 completed weeks (usually about 154 days) of gestation (the time when birth weight is normally 500 g) to 7 completed days after birth. In many of the developing countries the starting point of this period is considered 28 completed weeks of gestation (or weight more than 1000 g).

== Fertilization ==
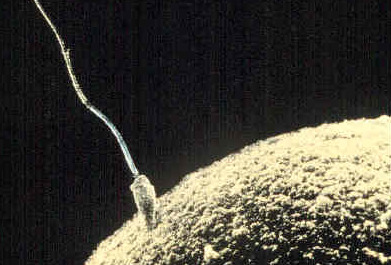
A sperm cell fertilizing an egg cell

Fertilization marks the first germinal stage of embryonic development. When semen is released into the vagina, the spermatozoa travel through the cervix, along the body of the uterus, and into one of the fallopian tubes where fertilization usually takes place in the ampulla. A great many sperm cells are released with the possibility of just one managing to adhere to and enter the thick protective layer surrounding the egg cell (ovum). The first sperm cell to successfully penetrate the egg cell donates its genetic material (DNA) to combine with the DNA of the egg cell resulting in a new one-celled zygote. The term "conception" refers variably to either fertilization or to formation of the conceptus after its implantation in the uterus, and this terminology is controversial.

The zygote will develop into a male if the egg is fertilized by a sperm that carries a Y chromosome, or a female if the sperm carries an X chromosome. The Y chromosome contains a gene, SRY, which will switch on androgen production at a later stage leading to the development of a male body type. In contrast, the mitochondrial DNA of the zygote comes entirely from the egg cell.

== Development of the embryo ==
The initial stages of human embryogenesis

Following fertilization, the embryonic stage of development continues until the end of the 10th week (gestational age) (8th week fertilization age). The first two weeks from fertilization is also referred to as the germinal stage or preembryonic stage.

The zygote spends the next few days traveling down the fallopian tube dividing several times to form a ball of cells called a morula. Further cellular division is accompanied by the formation of a small cavity between the cells. This stage is called a blastocyst. Up to this point there is no growth in the overall size of the embryo, as it is confined within a glycoprotein shell, known as the zona pellucida. Instead, each division produces successively smaller cells.

The blastocyst reaches the uterus at roughly the fifth day after fertilization. The blastocyst hatches from the zona pellucida allowing the blastocyst's outer cell layer of trophoblasts to come into contact with, and adhere to, the endometrial cells of the uterus. The trophoblasts will eventually give rise to extra-embryonic structures, such as the placenta and the membranes. The embryo becomes embedded in the endometrium in a process called implantation. In most successful pregnancies, the embryo implants 8 to 10 days after ovulation. The embryo, the extra-embryonic membranes, and the placenta are collectively referred to as a conceptus, or the "products of conception".

Rapid growth occurs and the embryo's main features begin to take form. This process is called differentiation, which produces the varied cell types (such as blood cells, kidney cells, and nerve cells). A spontaneous abortion, or miscarriage, in the first trimester of pregnancy is usually due to major genetic mistakes or abnormalities in the developing embryo. During this critical period the developing embryo is also susceptible to toxic exposures, such as:

- Alcohol, certain drugs, and other toxins that cause birth defects, such as fetal alcohol syndrome
- Infection (such as rubella or cytomegalovirus)
- Radiation from x-rays or radiation therapy
- Nutritional deficiencies such as lack of folate which contributes to spina bifida

=== Nutrition ===
The embryo passes through 3 phases of acquisition of nutrition from the mother:

1. Absorption phase: Zygote is nourished by cellular cytoplasm and secretions in fallopian tubes and uterine cavity.
2. Histoplasmic transfer: After nidation and before establishment of uteroplacental circulation, embryonic nutrition is derived from decidual cells and maternal blood pools that open up as a result of eroding activity of trophoblasts.
3. Hematotrophic phase: After third week of gestation, substances are transported passively via intervillous space.

== Development of the fetus ==
The first ten weeks of gestational age is the period of embryogenesis and together with the first three weeks of prenatal development make up the first trimester of pregnancy.

From the 10th week of gestation (8th week of development), the developing embryo is called a fetus. All major structures are formed by this time, but they continue to grow and develop. Because the precursors of the organs are now formed, the fetus is not as sensitive to damage from environmental exposure as the embryo was. Instead, toxic exposure often causes physiological abnormalities or minor congenital malformation.

=== Development of organ systems ===
Development continues throughout the life of the fetus and through into life after birth. Significant changes occur to many systems in the period after birth as they adapt to life outside the uterus.

==== Fetal blood ====
Hematopoiesis first takes place in the yolk sac. The function is transferred to the liver by the 10th week of gestation and to the spleen and bone marrow beyond that. The total blood volume is about 125 ml/kg of fetal body weight near term.

==== Red blood cells ====
Megaloblastic red blood cells are produced early in development, which become normoblastic near term. Life span of prenatal RBCs is 80 days. Rh antigen appears at about 40 days of gestation.

==== White blood cells ====
The fetus starts producing leukocytes at 2 months gestational age, mainly from the thymus and the spleen. Lymphocytes derived from the thymus are called T lymphocytes (T cells), whereas those derived from bone marrow are called B lymphocytes (B cells). Both of these populations of lymphocytes have short-lived and long-lived groups. Short-lived T cells usually reside in thymus, bone marrow and spleen; whereas long-lived T cells reside in the blood stream. Plasma cells are derived from B cells and their life in fetal blood is 0.5 to 2 days.

==== Glands ====
The thyroid is the first gland to develop in the embryo at the 4th week of gestation. Insulin secretion in the fetus starts around the 12th week of gestation.

==== Skull ====
Skull bones form through the process of ossification on either a membranous or cartilaginous template. The bones of the cranial vault develop by a membranous ossification, whereas the temporal bones form by a cartilaginous ossification. The bones of the cranial base (endocranium)—which support the brain (occipital, sphenoid, and ethmoid bones)—develop predominantly by a cartilaginous ossification. Thus, the frontal and parietal bones are formed exclusively on a membranous template. The geometry of the cranial base and its fossae—anterior, middle, and posterior—undergoes rapid changes. The anterior cranial fossa changes particularly intensely during the first trimester of pregnancy; this is a period when cranial malformations frequently arise. Prenatal growth of the anterior cranial fossa is not uniform. Allometric growth is observed during the first trimester, with the longitudinal dimension increasing from 5 to 17 millimeters between the 8th and 14th weeks of fetal life. Concurrently, the angle of the anterior cranial fossa decreases, and its depth increases towards the middle cranial fossa. Growth continues into the second trimester but becomes more uniform, with the angle of the anterior cranial fossa undergoing only minor changes.

== Cognitive development ==
Electrical brain activity is first detected at the end of week 5 of gestation. Synapses do not begin to form until week 17. Neural connections between the sensory cortex and thalamus develop as early as 24 weeks' gestational age, but the first evidence of their function does not occur until around 30 weeks, when minimal consciousness, dreaming, and the ability to feel pain emerges. REM sleep develops at around 30 weeks and comprises the majority of sleep (up to 80% of total sleep time). The proportion of REM sleep is progressively reduced to 58% by 36–38 weeks.

Initial knowledge of the effects of prenatal experience on later neuropsychological development originates from the Dutch Famine Study, which researched the cognitive development of individuals born after the Dutch famine of 1944–45. The first studies focused on the consequences of the famine to cognitive development, including the prevalence of intellectual disability. Such studies predate David Barker's hypothesis about the association between the prenatal environment and the development of chronic conditions later in life. The initial studies found no association between malnourishment and cognitive development, but later studies found associations between malnourishment and increased risk for schizophrenia, antisocial disorders, and affective disorders.

There is evidence that the acquisition of language begins in the prenatal stage. After 26 weeks of gestation, the peripheral auditory system is already fully formed. Also, most low-frequency sounds (less than 300 Hz) can reach the fetal inner ear in the womb of mammals. Those low-frequency sounds include pitch, rhythm, and phonetic information related to language. Studies have indicated that fetuses react to and recognize differences between sounds. Such ideas are further reinforced by the fact that newborns present a preference for their mother's voice, present behavioral recognition of stories only heard during gestation, and (in monolingual mothers) present preference for their native language. A more recent study with EEG demonstrated different brain activation in newborns hearing their native language compared to when they were presented with a different language, further supporting the idea that language learning starts while in gestation.

== Growth rate ==
The growth rate of a fetus is linear up to 37 weeks of gestation, after which it plateaus. The growth rate of an embryo and infant can be reflected as the weight per gestational age, and is often given as the weight put in relation to what would be expected by the gestational age. A baby born within the normal range of weight for that gestational age is known as appropriate for gestational age (AGA). An abnormally slow growth rate results in the infant being small for gestational age, while an abnormally large growth rate results in the infant being large for gestational age. A slow growth rate and preterm birth are the two factors that can cause a low birth weight. Low birth weight (below 2000 grams) can slightly increase the likelihood of schizophrenia.

The growth rate can be roughly correlated with the fundal height of the uterus which can be estimated by abdominal palpation. More exact measurements can be performed with obstetric ultrasonography.

== Factors influencing development ==
Intrauterine growth restriction is one of the causes of low birth weight associated with over half of neonatal deaths.

=== Poverty ===
Poverty has been linked to poor prenatal care and has been an influence on prenatal development. Women in poverty are more likely to have children at a younger age, which results in low birth weight. Many of these expecting mothers have little education and are therefore less aware of the risks of smoking, drinking alcohol, and drug use – other factors that influence the growth rate of a fetus.

=== Mother's age ===
The term advanced maternal age is used to describe women who are over 35 during pregnancy. Women who give birth over the age of 35 are more likely to experience complications ranging from preterm birth and delivery by Caesarean section, to an increased risk of giving birth to a child with chromosomal abnormalities such as Down syndrome. The chances of stillbirth and miscarriage also increase with maternal age as do the chances of the mother suffering from Gestational diabetes or high blood pressure during pregnancy. Some sources suggest that health problems are also associated with teenage pregnancy. These may include high blood pressure, low birth weight and premature birth. Some studies note that adolescent pregnancy is often associated with poverty, low education, and inadequate family support. Stigma and social context tend to create and exacerbate some of the challenges of adolescent pregnancy.

=== Drug use ===
An estimated 5 percent of fetuses in the United States are exposed to illicit drug use during pregnancy. Maternal drug use occurs when drugs ingested by the pregnant woman are metabolized in the placenta and then transmitted to the fetus. Recent research displays that there is a correlation between fine motor skills and prenatal risk factors such as the use of psychoactive substances and signs of abortion (miscarriage) during pregnancy. As well as perinatal risk factors such as gestation time, duration of delivery, birth weight and postnatal risk factors such as constant falls.

==== Cannabis ====
When using cannabis, there is a greater risk of birth defects, low birth weight, and a higher rate of death in infants or stillbirths. Drug use will influence extreme irritability, crying, and risk for SIDS once the fetus is born. Marijuana will slow the fetal growth rate and can result in premature delivery. It can also lead to low birth weight, a shortened gestational period and complications in delivery. Cannabis use during pregnancy was unrelated to risk of perinatal death or need for special care, but, the babies of women who used cannabis at least once per week before and throughout pregnancy were 216g lighter than those of non‐users, had significantly shorter birth lengths and smaller head circumferences.

==== Opioids ====
Opioids including heroin will cause interrupted fetal development, stillbirths, and can lead to numerous birth defects. Heroin can also result in premature delivery, creates a higher risk of miscarriages, result in facial abnormalities and head size, and create gastrointestinal abnormalities in the fetus. There is an increased risk for SIDS, dysfunction in the central nervous system, and neurological dysfunctions including tremors, sleep problems, and seizures. The fetus is also put at a great risk for low birth weight and respiratory problems.

==== Cocaine ====
Cocaine use results in a smaller brain, which results in learning disabilities for the fetus. Cocaine puts the fetus at a higher risk of being stillborn or premature. Cocaine use also results in low birthweight, damage to the central nervous system, and motor dysfunction. The vasoconstriction of the effects of cocaine lead to a decrease in placental blood flow to the fetus that results in fetal hypoxia (oxygen deficiency) and decreased fetal nutrition; these vasoconstrictive effects on the placenta have been linked to the number of complications in malformations that are evident in the newborn.

==== Methamphetamine ====
Prenatal methamphetamine exposure has shown to negatively impact brain development and behavioral functioning. A 2019 study further investigated neurocognitive and neurodevelopmental effects of prenatal methamphetamine exposure. This study had two groups, one containing children who were prenatally exposed to methamphetamine but no other illicit drugs and one containing children who met diagnosis criteria for ADHD but were not prenatally exposed to any illicit substance. Both groups of children completed intelligence measures to compute an IQ. Study results showed that the prenatally exposed children performed lower on the intelligence measures than their non-exposed peers with ADHD. The study results also suggest that prenatal exposure to methamphetamine may negatively impact processing speed as children develop.

=== Alcohol ===
Maternal alcohol use leads to disruptions of the fetus' brain development, interferes with the fetus' cell development and organization, and affects the maturation of the central nervous system. Even small amounts of alcohol use can cause lower height, weight and head size at birth and higher aggressiveness and lower intelligence during childhood. Fetal alcohol spectrum disorder is a developmental disorder that is a consequence of heavy alcohol intake by the mother during pregnancy. Children with FASD have a variety of distinctive facial features, heart problems, and cognitive problems such as developmental disabilities, attention difficulties, and memory deficits.

=== Tobacco use ===
Tobacco smoking during pregnancy exposes the fetus to nicotine, tar, and carbon monoxide. Nicotine results in less blood flow to the fetus because it constricts the blood vessels. Carbon monoxide reduces the oxygen flow to the fetus. The reduction of blood and oxygen flow may result in miscarriage, stillbirth, low birth weight, and premature births. Exposure to secondhand smoke leads to higher risks of low birth weight and childhood cancer.

=== Infections ===
If a mother is infected with a disease, the placenta cannot always filter out the pathogens. Viruses such as rubella, chicken pox, mumps, herpes, and human immunodeficiency virus (HIV) are associated with an increased risk of miscarriage, low birth weight, prematurity, physical malformations, and intellectual disabilities. HIV can lead to acquired immune deficiency syndrome (AIDS). Untreated HIV carries a risk of between 10 and 20 per cent of being passed on to the fetus. Bacterial or parasitic diseases may also be passed on to the fetus, and include chlamydia, syphilis, tuberculosis, malaria, and commonly toxoplasmosis. Toxoplasmosis can be acquired through eating infected undercooked meat or contaminated food, and by drinking contaminated water. The risk of fetal infection is lowest during early pregnancy, and highest during the third trimester. However, in early pregnancy the outcome is worse, and can be fatal.

=== Maternal nutrition ===
Adequate nutrition is needed for a healthy fetus. Mothers who gain less than 20 pounds during pregnancy are at increased risk for having a preterm or low birth weight infant. Iron and iodine are especially important during prenatal development. Mothers who are deficient in iron are at risk for having a preterm or low birth weight infant. Iodine deficiencies increase the risk of miscarriage, stillbirth, and fetal brain abnormalities. Adequate prenatal care gives an improved result in the newborn.

=== Low birth weight ===
Low birth weight increases an infants risk of long-term growth and cognitive and language deficits. It also results in a shortened gestational period and can lead to prenatal complications.

=== Stress ===
Stress during pregnancy can have an impact on the development of the embryo. Nicole Reilly in he 2017 article states that stress can come from many forms of life events such as community, family, financial issues, and natural causes. While a woman is pregnant, stress from outside sources can take a toll on the growth in the womb that may affect the child's learning and relationships when born. For instance, they may have behavioral problems and might be antisocial. The stress that the mother experiences affects the fetus and the fetus' growth which can include the fetus' nervous system. Stress can also lead to low birth weight. Even after avoiding other factors like alcohol, drugs, and being healthy, stress can have its impacts whether families know it or not. Many women who deal with maternal stress do not seek treatment. Similar to stress, Reilly stated that in recent studies, researchers have found that pregnant women who show depressive symptoms are not as attached and bonded to their child while it is in the womb.

=== Environmental toxins ===
Exposure to environmental toxins in pregnancy lead to higher rates of miscarriage, sterility, and birth defects. Toxins include fetal exposure to lead, mercury, and ethanol or hazardous environments. Prenatal exposure to mercury may lead to physical deformation, difficulty in chewing and swallowing, and poor motoric coordination. Exposure to high levels of lead prenatally is related to prematurity, low birth weight, brain damage, and a variety of physical defects. Exposure to persistent air pollution from traffic and smog may lead to reduced infant head size, low birth weight, increased infant death rates, impaired lung and immune system development.

== See also ==
- Prenatal memory
- Prenatal and perinatal psychology
- Fetal pig
- Timeline of human prenatal development
- Transplacental carcinogenesis
