= Turner Controversy =

Movement for Social Integration
- Spokesperson: Tony Turner
- Founded: 1955
- Split from: Socialist Party of Great Britain

The Turner Controversy was a dispute within the Socialist Party of Great Britain (SPGB) regarding the nature of socialism instigated by party member Tony Turner. The dispute ultimately led to an exodus of members who formed the short-lived Movement for Social Integration.

When membership and activity was at a peak in the period after the Second World War, Turner began giving lectures for the party on what he envisioned socialism would be like. The content of these lectures led him to develop a position that caused controversy in the party by the early to mid-1950s and which was elaborated by Turner and his supporters in articles in the party’s internal discussion journal of the time, Forum.

Three interlocking propositions underpinned the ‘Turnerite’ viewpoint:

1. that the society of mass consumerism and automated labour which capitalism had become had to be swept away in its entirety if alienation was to be abolished and a truly human community created. This meant a return to pre-industrial methods of production, on lines inspired by Tolstoy and William Morris’ News From Nowhere.
2. that the creation of the new socialist society was not simply in the interests of the working class but was in the interests of the whole of humanity, irrespective of class, a proposition they thought it essential for the Party to recognise in its everyday propaganda, and
3. the means of creating the new peaceful and cooperative society had to be entirely peaceful, indeed pacifist (and in the view of some, possibly even gradual).

This view was in direct contradiction to the party's 'Declaration of Principles', which identifies socialism as being the product of class struggle and which claims that the socialist movement will organise for the capture of political power, including power over the state’s coercive machinery, which can be wielded to repress those who resist the imposition of socialism.

A series of acrimonious disputes between the ‘Turnerites’ and the majority of the party culminated in a party referendum and then a resolution being carried at the 1955 party conference to the effect that all members not in agreement with the Declaration of Principles be asked to resign. Turner, having survived a previous attempt to expel him, promptly did so, along with a number of other members including Joan Lestor (later to become a Labour minister) and the psychologist John Rowan. Some of these ex-members formed a short-lived Movement for Social Integration, though the impact the dispute had on the party as a whole was almost entirely disruptive and negative.

== See also ==
- Socialist Party of Great Britain breakaway groups#The Movement for Social Integration
- Luddism

== Bibliography ==
- Barltrop, Robert (1975). The Monument: The Story of the Socialist Party of Great Britain. London: Pluto Press. pp. 144–153. ISBN 0-904383-00-8.
- DAP (June 2004). "Getting Splinters". Socialist Standard. 100 (1198). Socialist Party of Great Britain: 38–41. ISSN 0037-8259.
