= Systematic ideology =

Study of the ideologies of 1930s London

Systematic ideology is a study of ideologies founded in the late 1930s in and around London, England by Harold Walsby, George Walford and others. It seeks to understand the origin and development of ideologies, how ideologies and ideological groups work together and the possibilities of guiding the development of ideologies on a global scale. The basic premise of systematic ideology is that ideology is the central motivator in human affairs; that the characteristics that make up the major ideologies come in sets; that those sets of characteristics form a series; and that the ideological series forms a system.

== History ==
Cover of the Social Science Association pamphlet The Intellectual and the People

The group that formed around Harold Walsby and his ideas was a breakaway from the Socialist Party of Great Britain /SPGB). During the Second World War, this group developed a fascination with perceived impediments to mass socialist consciousness among the working class. The theory they developed was expressed by Walsby himself in his 1947 book The Domain of Ideologies and those involved in the group set up an organisation to propagate their views called the Social Science Association (SSA) which existed from 1944 until 1956, attracting a number of new recruits during the Turner Controversy. It was later succeeded by the Walsby Society and the journal which emerged from it called Ideological Commentary.

From the 1980s onwards, George Walford, editor of Ideological Commentary and former secretary of the SSA, watered down some of the theory's more obviously elitist elements and even left the SPGB money at the time of his death. He did this on the grounds that although in his view the party would never help achieve socialism, it did perform a valuable function by demonstrating through its application of critical analysis, logical thought and theory the limitations of other political groups that valued these less highly (a perspective which had informed Harold Walsby's decision in 1950 to surreptitiously rejoin the party through its postal branch and write articles for the Socialist Standard under the pseudonym H. W. S. Bee).

Ideological Commentary survived until the death of Walford in 1994. As of 2007, barely a handful of systematic ideology's exponents remain.

Walsby, Walford and their group produced a large number of leaflets, pamphlets and other literature over time, a fair chunk of it dealing with the SPGB. The most readable expressions of systematic ideology are Walford's book Beyond Politics, published in 1990; and the pamphlet Socialist Understanding, published ten years earlier.

== Theory ==
The theory of the group developed over time and was re-christened systematic ideology by Walford in 1976. Its basic premise was that people's assumptions and identifications (the factors making up their ideology) are not explicable in terms of material conditions in general and their relationship to the means of production in particular—and are never likely to be. Instead, there are persistent and distinct ideological groups in society, cutting across social classes and forming a series, with the largest groups being most typically guided in their thoughts and actions by a preference for family, authority, familiarity and tradition. Politically, these preferences find predominant expression in the ideas of the large number of so-called non-politicals in society and in conservatism and then liberalism (the strength of these preferences gradually weakening through the series).

As the series progresses further, the next, progressively smaller, ideological groups seek to repress these identifications and preferences in favor of dynamism, social change, logical thought and the pursuit of theory as a guide to decision-making, these being expressed politically in labourism, more overtly still in communism and then in an ultimate and extreme form in anarchism (or anarcho-socialism, the purist variety of it allegedly expounded by the SPGB). The more an ideology represses the preferences for family, tradition and so on in favour of social change, dynamism and the pursuit of theory as a guide to action, the fewer in number its adherents are likely to be, with anarchists (or anarcho-socialists) being the smallest of all. Those seeking radical social change, so the theory contends, will always be hampered and restrained by the enduring preferences of the largest ideological groups.

=== George Walford ===
In his book Beyond Politics, George Walford seeks to analyse ideologies on the basis of its adherents' surface behaviors, their underlying sentiments and assumptions ("ethos") and underlying cognitions ("eidos"). Of particular interest to him are a single group, the non-politicals; and five major political ideologies (conservatism, liberalism, socialism, communism and anarchism) which can be listed as a series, with each seeking to repress its predecessor. He forms a series of hypotheses about the nature of those six ideologies, observing that they may be gauged upon different dimensions. According to relative size and political influence of its adherents, their relative reliance upon theory over practice and the degree to which they sought change. He postulates that the non-politicals have the greatest influence and least interest in theory while anarchists exhibit the least influence and greatest interest in theory, with the rest having mixed degrees of those properties.

He also formulates that each is relative to certain ideological ethos: a) (short-term) expediency; b) (traditional) principles; c) precision; d) (fundamental) reform; e) revolution; and e) repudiation. By his formulations, historical change, development of technology and development of more complicated social relations can be explained as occurring in stages along this series:

1. For Walford, all societies historically begin in a state where a mass of individuals engage in expediency at the hunter-gatherer level. This state of affairs is characterized by short-term individual economic behavior and collective political action.
2. Societies grow to have more advanced and secure political systems at the same time that they make better use of agricultural technology with more long-term goals in mind. In the process, economic behavior becomes more and more collectivistic. From then on, the societies engage in wars and conquer. Empires grow and create obedience with the mask of traditional principles.
3. Finally, societies enter a stage where principles espoused actually begin to be followed, enacted, and made more precise. Similarly, economic production becomes more bureaucratic and rationally goal-oriented.
4. The remaining three forms of ethos—reform, revolution, and repudiation—when taken together are seen to compose the envisioned fourth stage in historical development.

While some other philosophers have expressed the opinion that political liberalism is the peak or end-stage of historical development (see Francis Fukuyama's "End of History" thesis), Walford claims the opposite, saying: "More than ever before, our world is a boiling, bounding, bubbling ferment of ideological novelty, and the rate of change is accelerating. If the ideological system has reached completion it is only in the sense that a newborn child is complete".

== Criticism ==
Historically, systematic ideology has been unable to produce a falsifiable and causal model for what it is that influences some people and not others to gravitate towards a particular ideology.

Walsby's early version of the theory was clearly hierarchical (with those understanding the theory being the smallest group of all, metaphorically positioned at the apex of a pyramid, just above the SPGB) and it lent itself to criticism on the grounds that it was merely a particularly convoluted type of human nature argument. This was essentially the response outlined in the Socialist Standard's April 1949 review of Walsby's book called The Domain of Sterilities.

Twin studies have shown that genetics have a strong effect on both attitude formation, and receptivity to ideological affiliation. This may provide some answer to the criticism that systematic ideology lacks a causal model. According to one study:

We found that political attitudes are influenced much more heavily by genetics than by parental socialization. For the overall index of political conservatism, genetics accounts for approximately half the variance in ideology while shared environment (including parental socialization) accounts for only 11 percent.

== Publications ==
- The Domain of Ideologies. 1947. OCLC 751392696.
- Walford, George (1990). Beyond Politics. Calabria Press. ISBN 978-0-9505445-6-4.
- Socialist Understanding. 1980. OCLC 82747736.
- S.P.G.B. - Utopian or Scientific? The Fallacy of the Overwhelming Minority. 1949. OCLC 83399662.
- Ideological Commentary (1979-1994). ISSN 0960-8761.
- 999 Emergency. 1946. OCLC 504152694.

== See also ==
- History of ideas
- John Rowan (psychologist)
- Political spectrum
- World Values Survey
