= Frank Lake =

Pioneer of pastoral counselling

Frank Lake (6 June 1914 – 10 May 1982) was a British psychiatrist and one of the pioneers of pastoral counselling in the United Kingdom. In 1962, he founded the Clinical Theology Association with the primary aim to make clergy more effective as listeners in understanding and accepting the psychological origins of their parishioners’ personal difficulties (see abridged Clinical Theology, chapter one, 'The relevance and value of listening and dialogue'). However, the training in pastoral counselling, which he began in 1958, eventually enlisted professional and lay people in various fields from various denominations. Many thousands of people attended the seminars.

== Life ==
Lake was born on 6 June 1914 in Aughton, Lancashire. His parents were committed Christians. His father, John Lake, was both a stockbroker in Liverpool and the organist and choirmaster in their parish. His mother, Mary, had trained as a teacher. Lake was the eldest of three sons.

Lake studied medicine at Edinburgh University, graduating with degrees in medicine and surgery in 1937. With missionary work in mind, he trained in parasitology at the Liverpool School of Tropical Medicine and took up an appointment with the Church Mission Society to serve in India. During World War II he was recruited into the Indian Medical Service, from which he emerged with the rank of lieutenant-colonel in 1945. His fiancée, Sylvia Smith, joined him in 1944 and they were married in Poona, where the eldest of their three children, David, was born. In 1946 Lake was posted to the parasitology department of the Vellore Medical Centre.

Lake changed directions from parasitology to psychiatry after he was appointed as superintendent of the Christian Medical College in Madras. In the early 1950s, he undertook retraining as a psychiatrist, first at The Lawn, Lincoln, then at Scalebor Park Hospital in Burley, Yorkshire. His allegiance was to the object-relations school of psychoanalysis. He believed that the first trimester of embryonal development was the most important part of a person's life. He was encouraged by the exploration of prenatal and perinatal influences of Fodor, Peerbolte, Mott, Donald Winnicott and Swartley. He was critical of Freud's about-face having first backed Rank's emphasis on the birth trauma.

Lake was a contemporary of Stanislav Grof and both were researching the abreactive qualities of LSD. LSD 25 was invented by a Swiss pharmaceutical company in 1943 and had been sent to a number of psychiatric research clinics for study. He witnessed frequent abreactions of birth trauma in his patients and this was to guide his research for the rest of his life. He said:

I was assured by neurologists that the nervous system of the baby was such that it was out of the question that any memory to do with birth could be reliably recorded as fact. I relayed my incredulity to my patients, and, as always happens in such cases, they tended thereafter to suppress what I was evidently unprepared, for so-called scientific reasons, to believe. But then a number of cases emerged in which the reliving of specific birth injuries, of forceps delivery, of the cord round the neck, of the stretched brachial plexus, and various other dramatic episodes were so vivid, so unmistakable in their origin, and afterwards confirmed by the mother or other reliable informants, that my suspicion was shaken... At the end of the sixties the value of Reichian and bio-energetic techniques broke upon us, and we discovered that deeper breathing alone was a sufficient catalyst for primal recapitulation and assimilation. Nothing more 'chemical' than that was necessary, so we stopped using LSD. Clinical Theology, xx, quoted in Maret, op. cit.

Lake's LSD research was conducted from 1954 to 1970. In the later decade he evaluated many new techniques including transactional analysis, primal therapy, gestalt therapy, and Re-evaluation Counseling.

Lake died from pancreatic cancer in May 1982.

== Clinical Theology Movement ==
The Clinical Theology Movement has its roots in the UK, where Lake established the Clinical Theology Association in 1962 and remained its forerunner up until his death in 1982. In 2007, the National Association of Clinical Theology was founded by Dr. Russel Levassar in the US

== See also ==
- Pre- and perinatal psychology
- Body psychotherapy
- Somatic psychology

== Works ==
- Lake Frank (1966) Clinical Theology. Darton LT, London UK. ISBN 0232481911
- Lake Frank (1981) Tight Corners in Pastoral Counselling. Darton LT, London UK. ISBN 0232513090
- Lake Frank (1982) With Respect. Darton LT, London UK. ISBN 0232515654
- Lake Frank (1991) In the Spirit of Truth. Darton LT, London UK. ISBN 0232519315
- Frank Lake (2006) Clinical Theology – A Theological and Psychiatric Basis for Clinical Pastoral Care. Lexington, KY: Emeth Press. ISBN 0977655504
- Lake Frank (2009) Mutual Caring: A Manual of Depth Pastoral Care, edited by Stephen M. Maret, foreword by Thomas C. Oden. Emeth Press, ISBN 0979793580
