= Bill Swartley =

American psychologist

William Swartley (1927–1979) was an American psychologist who pioneered the primal integration mode of personal exploration.

== Education ==
Swartley was educated at Haverford College, The University of Tübingen, the Jung Institute of Zurich, the California Institute of Integral Studies, the University of the Pacific, and during significant time spent in India. He authored a master's thesis in 1954, at the Faculty of the American Academy of Asian Studies, College of the Pacific, in Stockton, California. The title of the thesis is: The Relation of the Concept of the Function of the Analytical Psychologist and the Function of the "Guru" or Spiritual Guide of Hinduism. The thesis includes much about the psychology of Carl Gustav Jung.

== Life ==
Born in 1927 in the United States, Swartley was the founder of the Centers for the Whole Person in Philadelphia, Mays Landing, NJ, New York, Toronto, and London. He was also a founder, in 1973, of the International Primal Association and was its first Executive Secretary. He was active in the American Psychological Association and promoted international cooperation in psychology in his workshops throughout North America and Europe.

Swartley developed 'Primal Integration' starting from about 1962. He summarized this development as follows:

Primal Integration is one of a number of primally oriented human maturation techniques which have evolved during the 1970's...The third 'new' thing about primal techniques is the adaption I have developed for use with average, maturing adults, called Primal Integration. Primal Integration utilizes regressive techniques with average adults within an educational rather than a therapeutic framework. That is, Primal Integration rejects the authoritarian medical model of treatment, and is an education rather than a therapy...Primal Integration, is a contribution of the Encounter Group Movement which began on the East and West coasts of the United States during 1962, grandfathered by Maslow and Perls. Thus, Primal Integration may be viewed historically as a child of the union of regressive psychotherapy and the Encounter Movement. (Swartley 1975)

He devoted the last ten years of his life promoting primal integration through workshops, training, lectures, and writings until his death in 1979 at the age of 52.

== Legacy ==
The International Primal Association (IPA) is based in the US and carries on and coordinates the work of individual practitioners of primal Integration around the world.

Primal Integration practitioners engaged in a court struggle with Arthur Janov in 1974 when Janov claimed the word "Primal" as his own and tried to prevent them using it in their name. The court found against Janov but at great financial cost to the IPA.

Johann-Georg Raben, a German psychologist, wrote his doctoral dissertation about Swartley's therapeutic approach in 1984. He describes in his dissertation the history, theory and practice of Swartley's maturation techniques, based on his own experiences during two workshops led by Swartley in Bavaria, Germany, and London, England, around 1978. Raben subsequently collected literature about the different "cathartic therapies". This voluminous collection of literature (including papers about Swartley's Primal Integration) was conferred into the archive of the Institut für Grenzgebiete der Psychologie und Psychohygiene (IGPP) in Freiburg im Breisgau, Southern Germany around 1995. It remains there available under the keyword "Sammlung Dr. Raben".
