= Prenatal and perinatal psychology =

Psychology of the effects from pre-birth, during birth, and post-birth and events

Prenatal and perinatal psychology explores the psychological and psychophysiological effects and implications of the earliest experiences of the individual, before birth, prenatal, as well as during and immediately after childbirth, perinatal. Prenatal and perinatal psychology can be seen as a part of developmental psychology, although historically it was developed in the heterogenous field of psychoanalysis. Prenatal and perinatal psychology are often discussed together to group the period during pregnancy, childbirth, and through the early stages of infancy. The role of prenatal and perinatal psychology is to explain the experience and behavior of the individual before birth, postnatal consequences, and the lasting effects on development that occur during this time period.

Although there are various perspectives on the topic, a common thread is the importance of prenatal and perinatal experiences in the shaping the future psychological development. There is a debate among scientists regarding the extent to which newborn infants are capable of forming memories, the effects of any such memories on their personality, and the possibility of recovering them from an unconscious mind, which itself is the subject of argument in the field. A widespread assumption concerning the prenatal phase was that the fetus is almost completely shielded from outside stimuli. Thus, perception and consciousness would develop after birth. Meanwhile, there is a great number of scientific studies which show clearly that behaviour, perception and learning is already developed before birth. This also holds for nonhuman species, as for rat fetuses acoustic conditioning can be demonstrated.

== Psycho-physiological aspects of the prenatal and perinatal phases ==
Fetus, connected with the mother by umbilical cord and placenta

The physiological development while in the prenatal phase – especially that of the brain – is of particular importance for prenatal psychology. In the first eight weeks after insemination, the developing child is called an embryo. After the inner organs have developed (from the ninth week on) it is called a fetus. There are three stages of fetal development. The first stage is the germinal stage begins at conception and is the shortest stage. The second stage is the embryonic stage which begins around the third week of pregnancy and ends at the eighth week. The final stage is the fetal stage which begins at the ninth week of pregnancy and lasts until birth. Another way to measure pregnancy is by trimesters. The first trimester is from conception to 12 weeks of pregnancy, the second trimester is from 13 to 28 weeks of pregnancy, and the third trimester is from 29 weeks until birth. During the prenatal phase, the fetus is developing the structures to carry out cognitive functions, such as brain cells, brain waves, and forming the lobes and other structures of the brain.

=== Prenatal development ===
The basis of perception, experience, and behaviour is the brain. This is dependent on the presence of the structures in the brain that must be formed during gestation. While in gestation, a giant neuronal net is developing, delivering the condition for any mental process. About half of the developing neurons become destroyed again during the development of the brain because of the "programmed cell death" (apoptosis). At birth the infantile brain contains 100 billion neurons – as many as in the brain of an adult. In order to have this many neurons at birth, the fetus's brain must produce neurons at the rate of 250,000 per minute. At birth, every cortical neuron is connected with about 2500 neurons; after a year, with about 15 000. Synapses develop, and are destroyed, over the whole life span – a process called neuroplasticity.

In the first trimester, the 3 to 4 weeks following conception, the neural groove closes into the neural tube that the human brain develops from to create the hindbrain, midbrain, and the forebrain. These three structures are vital for human development. The hindbrain regulates unconscious automatic functions, the midbrain is a relay center for sensory and motor nerve impulses, and the forebrain is essential for processing incoming information. The spinal cord will also develop from this neural tube in the first trimester. If this neural tube does not close completely, the fetus may have a birth disorder called spina bifida. In the case of spina bifida myelomeningocele, the fetus may experience changes to their brain structure among other developmental problems. The second trimester is also essential for perinatal brain development. By week 20 of pregnancy, the area of the brain that is responsible for the awareness of the fetus's five sense begins to develop. In the fifth month of pregnancy, the fetal senses can be stimulated which results in the growth of synapses. The fetus, while not able to make sense of and process what they are hearing, has the ability to hear, feel pressure and different temperatures. The third trimester has many perinatal brain development milestones. In the 30th week, the fetus can control its own body heat. In the 31st week, the fetus is able to process more stimuli and information. While the other structures and organs of the fetus are mostly formed by this point, the brain continues to develop and only weighs two-thirds of what it should at birth.

Maternal care during pregnancy has a lot of impact throughout prenatal development. One factor of improper maternal care is the use of substances throughout pregnancy which has several different effects on the fetus. Those who are pregnant and use substances during pregnancy have an association with also delaying or not seeking prenatal care, and those who delay prenatal care typically do not participate in follow up services. This is most likely to occur in younger pregnancy situations with alcohol abuse. This not only causes the fetus to be vulnerable to negative physiological and psychological effects as a result of no prenatal care, but it also creates insecure attachment of the mother towards the fetus during the prenatal stage which can then translate to insecure attachment in the perinatal stage.

Perinatal Development

The development that occurs during the perinatal period is extremely impactful and predictive of the ability to emotionally regulate later in life. Secure attachment is essential to healthy development in the early infancy and perinatal stages. Improper attachment during these early stages can result in negative psychiatric manifestations including reactive attachment disorder (RAD), post traumatic stress disorder (PTSD), personality disorders, or disinhibited social engagement disorder. John Bowlby and Mary Ainsworth developed the attachment theory that describes the differences in avoidant-insecure attachment, disorganized-insecure attachment, secure attachment, and ambivalant-insecure attachment as well as the formation of attachment. The process of forming attachment begins at birth in the pre-attachment stage which lasts from birth to six weeks. In this stage, there is indiscriminate attachment where the infant will seek comfort in any caregiver. The next stage is attachment in the making occurring from the first six weeks to six months of the infants life. This stage is when the infant is more aware of a distinct caregiver and will seek comfort and trust in them. Following this stage is the clear-cut attachment stage which begins at six months old in the infant and lasts until they are about two years old. This is the stage in which the attachment style is most clear and will reflect the formation of reciprocal relationships stage from two years old and onwards.

There are several factors that could influence parental and child attachment types such as the status of the parental relationship. Parents and guardians who are in stable relationships have greater capability to respond to infants needs and provide more secure attachments in turn. Another factor of insecure attachment in the perinatal stage is the environment. Regardless of the parent or guardians ability to provide emotional support, if an infant is in an unsafe environment this often leads to attachment issues as a result of feeling unsafe, in pain, or feelings of distress. Maternal depression has the ability to result in attachment issues between mother and infant as depression causes the parent to be unable to respond to the infants cues. Parents and guardians who are depressed are less likely to make eye contact with their infant, show variety in facial expressions, or convey emotional activity. Lack of exposure to emotional variety especially conveying positive emotions towards an infant results in emotional disregulation and disorganized or anxious insecure attachment.

=== Motor development ===
In the 1930s the physiologist Davenport Hooker examined reflexes or reactions, respectively of aborted fetuses extrauterine. Currently, the motor skills of embryo and fetus can be examined with ultrasound techniques quite easily. From the eighth week on the embryo moves the rump, shortly after that his extremities. With the means of sonography one could demonstrate that these were not simple reflexes, but also endogenously provoked movements. According to Alessandra Piontelli, the fetus shows all patterns of movement which later can be found in the newborn.

The first movements in the fetus occur around the seven to eighth week of pregnancy. During this time, slight bending of the head and lower extremities can be picked up on. As the pregnancy progresses, so does movement of the fetus. General movements occur around the ninth and tenth week followed by more concise and complex movements. At the twelve to thirteen week milestone, the fetus can bring their hands towards their face. The thirteen to fourteen week mark shows evidence of the ability to swallow. The fifteenth week the fetus has the ability to suck their fingers. Eye movements are shown to exist from the 18th week on, from the 23rd week on there are rapid-eye-movements (REM-phases). These are connected with sleeping patterns and dreaming. Breath movements can be seen from the 19th week on, with the fetus taking amniotic fluid into his lungs. Fetuses drink amniotic fluid and urinate into it.

Fetal activity and motor development can be altered by a variety of maternal factors. There is higher fetal activity when the mother is laying down and a decrease in activity when the mother is active or during exercise. Use of substances while pregnant can also affect activity and development of the fetus. Use of opiates or alcohol while pregnant results in a decrease in amount and duration of movements of the fetus while nicotine can result in a decrease in movement of the fetus, especially breathing movements.

=== Development of perception and prenatal learning ===
The sense modalities of the fetus develop prenatally and are functioning very well at birth. The examination of such abilities is connected with experimental examination of behaviour, provoked by stimuli. Ray examined vibro-acoustic conditioning of human fetuses. According to Hepper it rested uncertain, if such conditioning was successful. Hepper claims to have repeat such conditioning experiments successfully, with the earliest vibro-acoustic conditioning in the 32nd week of gestation.

Prenatal learning often is examined by using the habituation paradigm. The fetus gets exposed to a stimulus, e.g. an acoustic one. Afterwards the experimenter watches the extinction of the reaction while repeating the same stimulus again and again. This procedure becomes completed by the use of a new stimulus and the recording of the according reaction. When the new stimulus is identified by the fetus as different from the old one, it releases a new pattern of reaction, e.g. accelerated frequency of the heart. If this does not happen, the new stimulus cannot be distinguished from the old focal stimulus. In 1991 a study demonstrated the acoustic habituation by recording the heart frequency of foetuses in the 29th week of gestation. Such studies can be used for examining memory. Fetuses older than 34 weeks of gestation can reproduce learned content over a period of 4 weeks. The earliest vibro-acoustic conditioning is successful at 22-week-old fetuses. Maybe habituation to taste is possible even earlier. Such habituation was also demonstrated in fetal rats.

Babies remember musical patterns they once heard in the womb, as W. Ernest Freud – a grandson of Sigmund Freud – could demonstrate. The empirical proof used the registration of heart frequency and motorical activity.

Also the development of speech is based on prenatal learning, as the study of DeCasper and Fifer from 1980 seems to demonstrate. This study used operant conditioning as a paradigm. Several empirical studies demonstrated that prenatal learning exists.

== Historical development of psychoanalytical and depth psychological theories concerning prenatal life ==
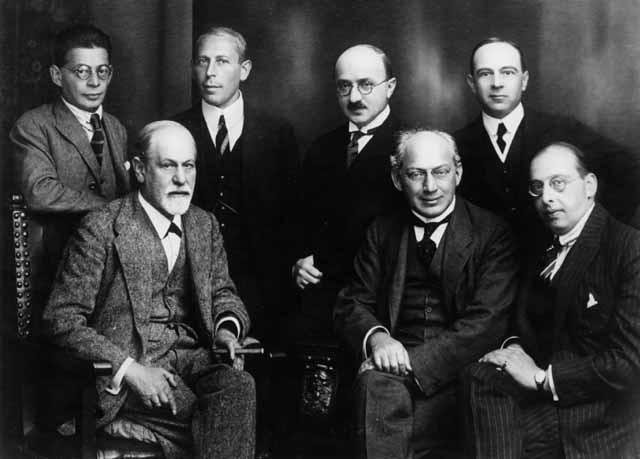
Otto Rank (standing, left corner) and other psychoanalysts in 1922

Most psychoanalytical theories assume that the development of objects, the self and even consciousness begins after birth. Nevertheless, some psychoanalysts explicitly write that pre- and perinatal aspects are responsible for certain symptom formations, among them Otto Rank, Nandor Fodor, Francis J. Mott, Donald Winnicott, Gustav Hans Graber and Ludwig Janus. They think that the structuring of the unconscious psyche starts in the prenatal phase. The fetus already has early, emotionally relevant experiences. They assume the existence of perception in several sense modaliaties, states of asphyxia, fears and stress, which are stored and can be remembered after birth under certain circumstances. In psychoanalysis pre- and perinatal topics usually are seen as fantasies. The manifest prenatal content of dreaming or fantasizing of swimming under water while breathing, being inside of a cave, fighting with underwater monsters – are interpreted as re-projections in time onto the early phase. Janus assumes that in many psychoanalytical approaches there can be found contentual and phenomenological aspects close to prenatal psychology – but without explicit references. Janus wrote of the "hidden attendance of the prenatal existence" in the works of psychoanalysts such as Sandor Ferenczi, Carl Gustav Jung, Melanie Klein, Bela Grunberger, Françoise Dolto and others.

In 1924 Otto Rank (1884–1939), one of Sigmund Freud's disciples, published his book The Trauma of Birth (German: Das Trauma der Geburt und seine Bedeutung für die Psychoanalyse). There he stated that the emotional shock of being born is an individual's first source of anxiety. Because of this book the friendship between Freud and Rank came to an end. Rank was of the opinion that birth is connected with an overwhelming experience of fear of the fetus. He also presumed that this trauma was the cause of later anxieties. He also claimed that aspects of the later prenatal phase can be remembered. So already Rank himself had developed the outlines of a true prenatal psychology. In the light of such assumptions he interpreted cultural aspects, e.g. he understood Christian fantasies of the hell as being based on aversive intrauterine situations. In his book, he treated the interpretation of symbols, art and myths by using pre- and perinatal assumptions. Rank believed that a "primal fixation" with the prenatal state is the root of all neuroses and character disorders and developed a process of psychoanalysis based on birth experiences.

Donald Winnicott (1896–1971) tried to understand very early forms of symbol formation. He described in several case studies the reenactment of perinatal experiences in psychotherapies, especially of children. A five-year-old boy climbed into Winnicott's jacket and then slit down the pants onto the ground. He repeated this again and again. Winnicott interpreted this game as a regression and a repeating of birth. He presumed that some babies developed a paranoid attitude by having problems at birth, e.g. in the case of asphyxia. Also psychosomatic symptoms (headaches, breast- and breathing problems and feelings of getting choked) were interpreted as possible consequences of birth experiences by Winnicott. Nevertheless, he rejected the assumption of a universal birth trauma.

In his book The Search for the Beloved: A Clinical Investigation of the Trauma of Birth and Prenatal Condition of 1949 the British-American psychoanalyst Nandor Fodor (1895–1964) traced certain forms of anxiety back to unprocessed and repressed birth experiences following Rank's assumptions, who had been his psychoanalyst. Fodor interpreted dreams, experiencing the lack of oxygen, claustrophobia and sexual disorders and their etiology, which he explained by assuming specific pre- and perinatal experiences.

Francis John Mott (1901–1980) was a disciple of Fodor and the first author who concentrated on the placenta as the first object of the fetus. He wrote, that the fetus fears his placenta as a "blood sucker" or experience it as a "feeder" or "life-giver". His work an prenatal aspects is connected with his speculative assumptions on a quasi-religious design of the universe.

Material emerging from sessions of psychedelic psychotherapy using LSD and other hallucinogenic drugs was the foundation for research into the enduring effects of pre- and perinatal experiences in adult life conducted by Frank Lake, Athanasios Kafkalides (1919–1989) and Stanislav Grof. Grof went on to formulate an extensive theoretical framework for the analysis of pre- and perinatal experiences, based on the four constructs he called Basic Perinatal Matrices. Lake and Grof independently developed breathing techniques, following Wilhelm Reich (1897–1957) as an alternative to the use of psychedelic drugs, which was subject to considerable legal difficulty from the mid-1960s onwards. A related technique called Rebirthing was developed by psychotherapist Leonard Orr in the 1970s, and Core Process psychotherapy trainees relive presumed birth trauma as part of their training.

The US-American social scientist Lloyd deMause (born 1931) compiled in his essay from 1981 the psychoanalytic approaches to prenatal mental life as well as the physiological findings of the human ontogenesis concerning fetal development. He took several assumptions from the works of Grof and Mott, but left away their metaphysical implications completely. In his own approach he assumes, that the placenta becomes the first object of the fetus, namely in two split versions: a positive and a negative one, he called the "nurturing" and the "poisonous placenta". DeMause presumed that in every gestation – especially at the end of this period – there are problems of supply with oxygen for the fetus. Because of physiological conditions the placenta would not be able anymore to supply the growing fetus with enough oxygen. This would give rise to states of pain and deprivation. Pre- and perinatal experiences lead to a mental script, a kind of pattern, to which later experiences would be connected with and internalized. He calls the experience of successive good and painful states the "fetal drama", long precursing the well known "oedipal drama" sensu Freud. Besides these theories about prenatal psychology deMause also developed approaches in the field of psychohistory – a system of cultural psychological assumptions, which explain historical processes and phenomenons by using psychological theories. Especially aspects of childhood history and prenatal psychology play an important role.

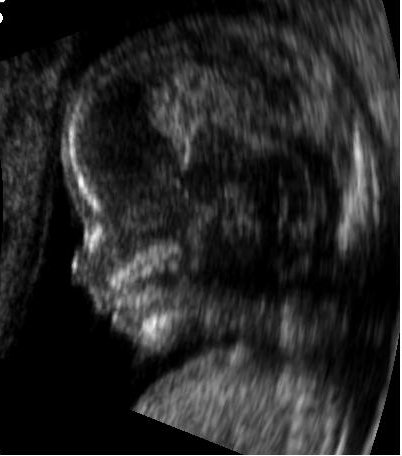
Fetus at 14 weeks (profile)

In 1992 the Italian child neuropsychiatrist Alessandra Piontelli (born 1945) published a study in her book From Fetus to Child: An Observational and Psychoanalytic Study (1992). Using sonography she examined the behaviour of 11 fetuses. The fetuses showed a very complex behavioural repertoire and were quite different concerning their forms of activities. They reacted to stimuli in complex ways. Piontelli's study suggested that certain prenatal experiences determined later mental life. Psychological traits, e.g. enhanced oral activity, were recognizable in the prenatal phase, and also after birth. Piontelli interpreted her observations in psychoanalytical terms. Piontelli saw a remarkable continuity between pre- and postnatal mental development. Her study is important, because it combines the assessment of empirical data with the observation of single case studies in the postnatal phase and also in infancy. Her study use equally the methods of academic psychology together with the hermeneutics of psychoanalysis, what makes it unique in the scientific landscape.

== See also ==
- Prenatal development
- Prenatal memory
