= Hans Neumann =

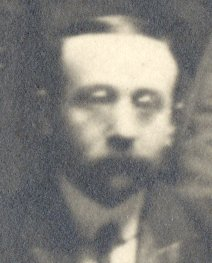
- Hans Neumann at the 1905 SPGB Conference
- Born: Unknown; Germany(?)
- Died: 1919(?); Germany(?)
- Political party: Socialist Party of Great Britain
- Movement: World Socialist Movement

Hans Neumann (a.k.a. Hans Newman) (18??–1919(?)) was a founding member of the Socialist Party of Great Britain.

Neumann had previously been very active in the Social Democratic Federation, being a public speaker for that party and secretary of its Chelsea & Fulham branch in 1897. Neumann was a well-known early Impossibilist, being a victim of the expulsions of April 1904 which led to the foundation of the Socialist Party of Great Britain in June.

A notable indoor and outdoor speaker for the SPGB (billed as Newman), he was also an enthusiastic writer for the Socialist Standard, translated foreign-language articles (including the pamphlets based on Kautsky’s The Class Struggle (Erfurt Program)) and was the author of the Party song (“The World for the Workers”). From 1904 to 1909 he was on the Executive Committee and from 1909 to 1911 was Treasurer.

Herbert Morrison described his encounters with Neumann in his 1960 autobiography as follows:

Neumann often spoke at one corner of the small Kennington Triangle while I spoke at another. Often our addresses degenerated into slanging matches which did have the advantage of attracting small crowds which might otherwise have passed by. Neumann was not loath to pour contempt on the views of people like me with all the fervour at his command. The more excited he got the stronger became his German accent. His final words were always the same, the clarion call from the Communist Manifesto of 1848: “Vurkers of the Vurld, unide! You haff a vurld to vin, and only your shains to loose!”

Neumann resigned on 12 September 1911. Along with Henry Martin, he had been a member of the Provisional Committee of 1911 which opposed notional Socialist MPs ever voting for reforms (the ‘WB of Upton Park affair’) and probably resigned on that issue. He was interned because of his German origin during the First World War where he met Rudolf Frank, co-founder of the Bund Demokratischer Sozialisten, the Austrian counterpart to the SPGB. He was presumably repatriated to Germany at the end of the war and is reputed to have died in the Spartacist uprising of January 1919.
