= Socialist Party =

Socialist Party is the name of many different political parties around the world. This list only includes parties that use the exact name "Socialist Party" for themselves, sometimes alongside the name of the country in which they operate. The list does not include political parties that use the word "Socialist" in addition to one or more other political adjectives in their names. For example, the numerous parties using the name "Socialist Workers' Party" are not included.

== Active parties ==
Nation	Party	Affiliation
Albania	Socialist Party of Albania	SI
Argentina	Socialist Party	PA, FSP
Bangladesh	Socialist Party of Bangladesh	
Bangladesh	Socialist Party (Marxist)	
Belgium	Socialist Party	SI, PES
Bolivia	Socialist Party	
Bosnia and Herzegovina	Socialist Party	
Brazil	Brazilian Socialist Party	FSP
Bulgaria	Bulgarian Socialist Party	SI, PES
Canada	Socialist Party of Canada (WSM)	WSM
Chile	Socialist Party of Chile	SI
Ecuador	Socialist Party – Broad Front of Ecuador	
Egypt	Socialist Party of Egypt	
France	Socialist Party	SI, PES
French Guiana	Guianese Socialist Party	
Gabon	Gabonese Socialist Party	
Greece	Panhellenic Socialist Movement	SI, PES
Guinea-Bissau	Socialist Party of Guinea-Bissau	
Hungary	Hungarian Socialist Party	SI, PES
India	Congress Socialist Party	
India	Socialist Party (1948)	
India	Socialist Party (2011)	
India	Samajwadi Party	
India	Mahajana Socialist Party	
Iraq	Assyrian Socialist Party	
Iceland	Icelandic Socialist Party	
Ireland	Socialist Party	ISA, EACL
Italy	Italian Socialist Party	SI, PES
Latvia	Socialist Party of Latvia	IMCWP, ICWP
Lithuania	Socialist Party (Lithuania)	
Macedonia	Socialist Party of Macedonia	PES
Malaysia	Socialist Party of Malaysia	
Mexico	Socialist Party of Mexico	
Moldova	Socialist Party of Moldova	
Morocco	Socialist Party	
Nepal	Nepal Socialist Party	
Netherlands	Socialist Party	
Nicaragua	Nicaraguan Socialist Party	
Nigeria	Socialist Party of Nigeria	
Peru	Socialist Party	FSP
Poland	Polish Socialist Party	
Portugal	Socialist Party	SI, PES
Romania	Romanian Socialist Party	IMCWP, PEL
Rwanda	Rwandese Socialist Party	
San Marino	Socialist Party	
Serbia	Socialist Party of Serbia	
Senegal	Socialist Party of Senegal	SI
Spain	Spanish Socialist Workers' Party	PES
Spain	Socialist Party of the Basque Country	SI, PES
Spain	Socialists' Party of Catalonia	PES
Spain	Socialists' Party of Galicia	PES
Spain	Majorca Socialist Party	EFA
Sri Lanka	Socialist Party of Sri Lanka	L5I
Sweden	Socialist Party	USFI
Switzerland	Swiss Socialist Party	SI, PES
Tajikistan	Socialist Party of Tajikistan	
Timor-Leste	Socialist Party of Timor	
Tunisia	Socialist Party	
Ukraine	Socialist Party of Ukraine	SI
Ukraine	Political Party "Socialists"	
United Kingdom	Socialist Labour Party (UK)	
United Kingdom	Socialist Party	CWI
United Kingdom	Socialist Party of Great Britain	WSM
United Kingdom	Scottish Socialist Party	EACL
United States	Socialist Party USA	
Uruguay	Socialist Party of Uruguay	SI
Yemen	Yemeni Socialist Party	SI

== Former parties ==
These are parties which no longer exist or have changed their name from "Socialist Party".

Nation	Party
Austria	Socialist Party of Austria
Australia	Socialist Party of Australia (1971)
Australia	Socialist Party
Belarus	Belarusian Socialist Party
Belgium	Belgian Socialist Party; Socialist Party (Flemish Community)
Bolivia	Socialist Party
Burkina Faso	Burkinabè Socialist Party
Burma	Burma Socialist Party
Canada	Socialist Party of British Columbia; Socialist Party of Canada; Socialist Party of Ontario; Socialist Party of North America
Croatia	Socialist Party of Croatia
Cyprus	Socialist Party of Cyprus
Ecuador	Ecuadorian Socialist Party
Egypt	Egyptian Socialist Party
France	French Socialist Party (1902); French Socialist Party (1919); Socialist Party of France (1902)
Iceland	Socialist Party
India	Socialist Party
Indonesia	Socialist Party of Indonesia; Socialist Party of Indonesia (Parsi)
Ireland	Socialist Party of Ireland (1904); Socialist Party of Ireland (1971)
Italy	Italian Socialist Party; Socialist Party (1996)
Japan	Japan Socialist Party
Netherlands	Socialist Party (Netherlands, interbellum)
New Zealand	New Zealand Socialist Party
Peru	Socialist Party of Peru
Poland	Silesian Socialist Party
Portugal	Portuguese Socialist Party
Puerto Rico	Puerto Rican Socialist Party; Socialist Party (Puerto Rico)
Romania	Socialist Party of Romania
San Marino	Sammarinese Socialist Party
Senegal	Senegalese Socialist Party
South Korea	Socialist Party
Soviet Union	Socialist Party
Spain	Andalusian Socialist Party
Sweden	Socialist Party
Thailand	Socialist Party of Thailand
Togo	Pan-African Socialist Party
Trinidad and Tobago	Caribbean Socialist Party
United Kingdom	British Socialist Party
United States	Socialist Party of America
Vietnam	Socialist Party of Vietnam

== See also ==
- Communist party
- Democratic Socialist Party (disambiguation)
- List of Labour Parties
- Lists of political parties
- Social Republican Party
- Socialist Equality Party (United Kingdom)
- Socialist Labor Party (disambiguation)
- Socialist People's Party (disambiguation)
- Socialist Workers Party (disambiguation)
