= Socialist Party of Canada (WSM) =

Socialist Party of Canada Parti socialiste du Canada
- Abbreviation: SPC
- Leader: None (membership conference)
- Founded: 1931; 95 years ago
- Preceded by: Socialist Party of Canada
- Headquarters: Victoria, British Columbia
- Newspaper: Western Socialist (1933–1980); Socialist Fulcrum (1968–1984); Socialisme Mondial (1973–1980); Imagine (2002–present)
- Ideology: Socialism; Classical Marxism; Anti-Leninism; Impossibilism
- Political position: Far-left
- International affiliation: World Socialist Movement
- Colours: Red

Website
- worldsocialism.org/canada

The Socialist Party of Canada (SPC) is a socialist political party in Canada, affiliated with the World Socialist Movement.

It was founded in June 1931 in Winnipeg, Manitoba by British Columbian politician Phyllis Corriveau.

The party adopted the policies of the Socialist Party of Great Britain (SPGB) which rejected Leninism, social democracy and trade unionism in favour of a belief in "revolutionary Marxism and democratic revolution".

== History ==
A Socialist Party of Canada had operated from 1904 to 1925, with support mostly in BC, Alberta and Manitoba.

The new SPC in 1931 was based in Winnipeg. Shortly after the founding of the new SPC, the left's fractured groups coalesced to form the Co-operative Commonwealth Federation (CCF), so the SPC did not make great headway. The Socialist Party of Canada based in Winnipeg remained outside of the CCF (and its successor, the New Democratic Party), because it rejected the CCF's evolutionary socialist approach and denigrated it by the label "reformist".

The Socialist Party of Canada (British Columbia), which was founded in 1932 by Ernest Winch independently of the Socialist Party of Canada founded in Winnipeg, joined and eventually merged with the CCF to form the British Columbia CCF.

The Socialist Party of Canada remained independent of the broader socialist movement and spread its message by holding town hall meetings, open air rallies and distributing literature at farmers markets and street corners.

In October 1933, the party launched the New Western Socialist Journal to help bring publicity to the party. The first two issues criticized the CCF and the Communist Party of Canada for allegedly compromising with capitalism. The SPC never found a reason to change its attitude towards the two parties.

=== World War II ===
During World War II, the SPC campaigned against the war, stating that working class blood should not be shed. During the war, the Communist Party was outlawed, but the SPC continued to hold anti-war demonstrations and rallies. The party was investigated by officials of the Government of Canada, but was never taken as a serious threat:

1939 was the year when The Western Socialist, the journal of the Socialist Party of Canada, moved to Boston and became a joint organ of the SPC and the World Socialist Party of the United States. [...] There were enough active Local Boston comrades to assure getting out a publication on a consistent basis (which they did from 1939 until 1980).

The party continues to publish socialist manifesto leaflets. When funds permitted, it ran candidates in elections. In the late 1970s, the head office was moved from Winnipeg to Victoria, British Columbia. The membership of the Socialist Party continued to decline and the party admits that it never managed to live up to the "success and glamour" of the old SPC of 1904-1925. The party has not wavered from the policies that it originally adopted many years ago.

== Election results by year ==
=== General elections ===
Year	Candidates	Votes	Popular vote
1935 federal election	1	251	0.01%
1958 federal election	2	1,113	0.02%

=== By-election, 29 May 1961 ===
Candidate	District	Votes	Popular vote	Place
Don Poirier	Esquimalt—Saanich	131	0.47%	5 of 5

== Present activity ==
The party promotes a post-capitalist socialist society. It seeks to achieve this by distributing socialist material around the world and raising class consciousness. The party believes that socialism must be implemented everywhere at the same time in order to work.

The bulk of current party members are in British Columbia and Ontario. It publishes a journal titled Imagine and distributes the literature of the SPGB.

The party is a member of the World Socialist Movement along with its "companion parties", the World Socialist Party of India, the World Socialist Party (New Zealand), the World Socialist Party of the United States and the Socialist Party of Great Britain.

== Publications ==
- Manifesto of the Socialist Party of Canada. 1944. OCLC 855441845.
- The Meaning of Social Revolution (1945)
- The Russian Revolution: Its Origins and Outcome (1948)
- The World of Abundance (1973)
- Economics Exposed (1984)

== See also ==
- Socialist Party of North America (1911)
- World Socialist Party of Canada (1960s)
