= Moses Baritz =

Moses Baritz (1883 – 29 March 1938) was a British music journalist and socialist activist.

== Early life ==
Baritz was born in Manchester to a Jewish family, originally from Odessa. He initially worked in the city's sweatshops, and there became interested in socialism; he was a founding member of the Socialist Party of Great Britain (SPGB). He also developed a great interest in music, particularly the opera of Wagner, and began public lectures on this subject.

== Socialism ==
Baritz remained loyal to the SPGB, at times as its only member in Manchester, and he became known for heckling at meetings of rival socialist groups. In particular, on one occasion when he was banned from entering a meeting of the Social Democratic Federation, he climbed on the roof and blew a clarinet down the ventilator shaft, ensuring that the meeting could not continue until he was eventually permitted to take a seat inside.

Baritz visited Toronto in 1911, and there gave speeches on the position of the SPGB. This encouraged a group of supporters to form the Socialist Party of North America, splitting away from the Socialist Party of Canada. He opposed British involvement in World War I, and in order to avoid conscription, he and fellow SPGB member Adolf Kohn moved to Detroit in 1915. Again, he gave speeches on socialism, attracting considerable crowds of members of the Socialist Party of America. A study group of supporters was formed, and the following year they founded the Socialist Party of the United States. By this point, Baritz had moved to New York, where he was interned for speaking against the war. Once released, he travelled to Australia and New Zealand, from which he was deported after only a brief stay. He spent several months at sea and was refused entry to numerous countries before finally returning to Manchester.

== Music journalist ==
Back in the UK, Baritz managed to find work as a music critic for the Manchester Guardian and began broadcasting on the Manchester radio station 2ZY. In June 1924, he presented a programme mixing speech and music, which has led some works to describe him as Britain's first radio disc jockey. He also worked for the Columbia Gramophone Company, lecturing on its behalf and acting as a musical adviser. Despite requests from the company that he relocate to London, he refused to leave Manchester, claiming that he could not do his job without access to the Henry Watson Music Library.

Baritz's health began to fail in the mid-1930s, and he died on 29 March 1938.
