= World In Common =

Left-wing political advocacy project

World in Common
- Spokesperson: Robin Cox
- Founded: November 2002
- Preceded by: Spanner (journal)
- Newspaper: Common Voice
- Ideology: Socialism

Website
- www.worldincommon.org

The World in Common (WiC) project was formed in November 2002 by former members of Spanner as an effort by various participants in the libertarian left to overcome the sectarian divisions that have historically prevented any attempts toward common understanding or potential cooperation among them.

This sectarianism was especially troublesome to those who saw that sharing the goals of abolishing Capitalism, no matter whether in its private, corporate or state varieties, and the State along with it -as well as a rejection of the vitiating distraction of reformist politics – was vastly more important than what the project terms "intra-sector" quarrels, especially when faced with the more important struggle against all forms of class rule.

== Object ==
The "sector" to which WiC's statements frequently refer consists of what some have called the "Thin Red/Black Line"; a shorthand way of referring to the small but highly diverse sector of various non-market, anti-statist, libertarian socialists – whether organised or not – consisting of; e.g., syndicalists, anarcho-communists, libertarian municipalists, world socialists, socialist industrial unionists, council communists, autonomists, platformists, situationists, ultra-leftists, etc.

== History ==
Previous efforts to bring these various elements together, and, to a greater or lesser extent, inspiring those who founded the World in Common project, were the Discussion Bulletin of Frank Girard, published from 1983 to July 2003, the year before Girard's death; The "Imagine International" circular among these same groups in the late 1990s; The Red Menace, a Canadian publication of the 1970s; as well as the writings of such thinkers as Maximilien Rubel, John Crump, and not infrequent references to the commonalities in many of the classic anarchist and socialist thinkers.

The purpose of WiC (according to the WiC "Core Statement")is "to help inspire a vision of an alternative way of living where all the world's resources are owned in common and democratically controlled by communities on an ecologically sustainable and socially harmonious basis". Of course, the many other groups and political parties in this sector have much the same objective but the role that WiC envisions for itself is unique. In their view, one of the reasons that the anti-market anti-statist sector remains relatively small and ineffectual has to do with the extent to which the various groups remain isolated from each other and regard each other with mutual suspicion, and even sectarian hostility.

== Theory ==
While explicitly not suggesting that all these "strands" of this sector submerge their differences and unite in some large organization, which is seen by WiC as both unrealistic and even undesirable, they do support an intermediate position between that extreme and the other, of exclusionist hostility. On that basis, they do not see themselves as rivals to any group in the sector and some members belong to one or other such groups. Nor do they see themselves, in any sense, as a political party. Among the members currently are self-identified council communists, anarcho-socialists, DeLeonists, libertarian socialists, and world socialists, both with and without organised affiliations to their political positions. World in Common was established to provide a meeting ground for the different groups and individuals within the sector as well as a means of facilitating practical collaboration between them at some level, while recognizing that there are sharp differences of opinion on many different subjects within our sector but what they do not feel has been sufficiently recognised – and celebrated – is just how much these groups have in common with each other. It is these commonalities that are, in fact, rather more significant than the issues that divide us which the World in Common network attempts to highlight by means of various websites, internet discussion groups, an occasional journal, Common Voice (2005), a collective blog, and various real world interactions with the various elements making up the "impossibilist" non-market political sector, whether they prefer the term anarchist, communist, socialist.

== Membership ==
Membership in the World in Common project is open to anti-capitalists, anti-statists, anti-reformists, anti-authoritarians, anti-vanguardists, anarchists, communists, socialists, syndicalists, anarcho-communists, libertarian municipalists, world socialists, socialist industrial unionists, council communists, and any who reject capitalism's wage, market, and money system as well as capitalist politics and capitalist unionism and who recognise that the above are on the same relative side in the struggle against all of capitalism's forces, including its statist left-wing of vanguardists and social democrats, and who seek ways to practically – in their local areas – assist this political sector to grow as a whole while engaging in comradely discussion at all levels, if in broad agreement with the Core Statement.
