= World Socialist Party (Ireland) =

- Leader: None
- Founded: 1949
- Dissolved: 1990s
- Headquarters: Donegall Street, Belfast, Northern Ireland
- Newspaper: Socialist View
- Ideology: Impossibilism; Classical Marxism; Socialism
- International affiliation: World Socialist Movement
- Colours: Red

The World Socialist Party (Ireland), founded as the Socialist Party of Ireland in 1949 before changing its name a decade later, was a Marxist political party in the impossibilist tradition. It was a companion party of the World Socialist Movement (WSM) and was closely connected to the Socialist Party of Great Britain (SPGB). The party's offices were in Belfast and it was most active in Northern Ireland, although it was also active in the Republic of Ireland. The party participated in elections in Northern Ireland, but without success. Socialist View was the party's newspaper. The party disbanded in the 1990s.

== Political positions ==
As with all parties in the WSM, the object of the World Socialist Party of Ireland was "[t]he establishment of a system of society based upon the common ownership and democratic control of the means and instruments for producing and distributing wealth by and in the interests of the whole community.

The party was staunchly anti-Leninist. Along with its companion parties in the WSM, it believed that socialism could only be established when the majority of the population decided that socialism was in their best interests, not through a revolutionary vanguard. The party held that parliament could and should be used in the course of establishing a socialist society.

The party stressed the limited nature of any reform within the capitalist system, saying of the Irish Labour Party that it "serves capitalism just as faithfully as the other political parties, and as you cannot serve capitalism and the majority of the people at the same time, the Labour Party is as much to be condemned from the workers' viewpoint as the others. It does not and cannot act in the interests of the Irish working class".

The party articulated its views on Northern Ireland and the Troubles in two documents, Ireland: Past, Present and Future (1983) and The Anglo-Irish Accord and Its Irrelevance for the Working Class (1986). Like other Marxist parties, it believed that the origins of the conflict lay in divide and rule tactics of the ruling class, of privileging Protestant workers over Catholic ones. Unlike many other parties of the left, it also believed that nationalism and identity politics were no solution. Indeed, it was argued that this focus stood in the way of achieving socialism and therefore both republican and loyalist paramilitaries were considered to be "fighting the bosses' battles". The British government was denounced for participating in political terrorism while claiming to oppose it. The Catholic civil rights campaign was also seen as amounting to nothing more than an insistence that the miseries of capitalism be distributed equally among the working class without regard to religion while something better could be created. The party did claim to oppose partition but only the partition "between the rich and the poor, between the capitalist class and the working class".

The party viewed the Irish War of Independence in much the same light as it viewed the later conflict in Northern Ireland, saying that as far as the working class was concerned, it only amounted to a change in masters.

== Publications ==
- Manifesto of the Socialist Party of Ireland. 1949. OCLC 939655771.
- Ireland: Past, Present and Future. 1983. OCLC 30917390.
- The Anglo-Irish Accord and it's Irrelevance for the Working Class. 1986.
