= League of Democratic Socialists =

Bund Demokratischer Sozialisten
- Ideology: Anti-Leninism; Classical Marxism; Impossibilism; Socialism
- Colours: Red

The League of Democratic Socialists (German: Bund Demokratischer Sozialisten) was an Austrian political party formerly affiliated with the World Socialist Movement (WSM).

Unlike most other WSM parties, it did not start as an offshoot of the Socialist Party of Great Britain (SPGB). The party contested the 1959 legislative election, getting 2,190 votes (0.05%).

== Sources ==
- Autengruber, Peter [in German] (1997). Kleinparteien in Österreich 1945 bis 1966 [Small parties in Austria from 1945 to 1966] (in German). Innsbruck, Vienna: Studienverlag.
