= Western Socialist =

Canadian then American socialist magazine

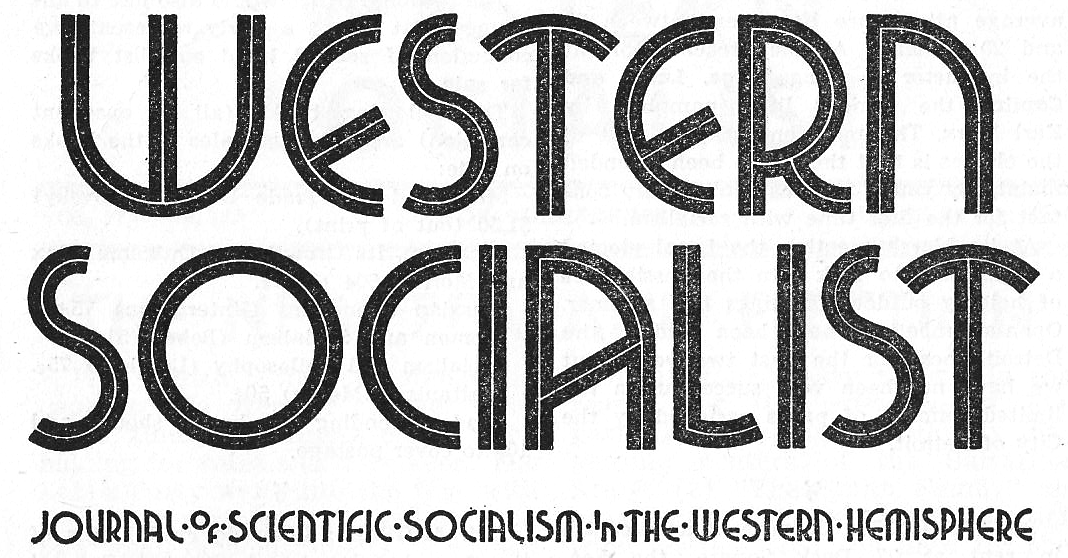

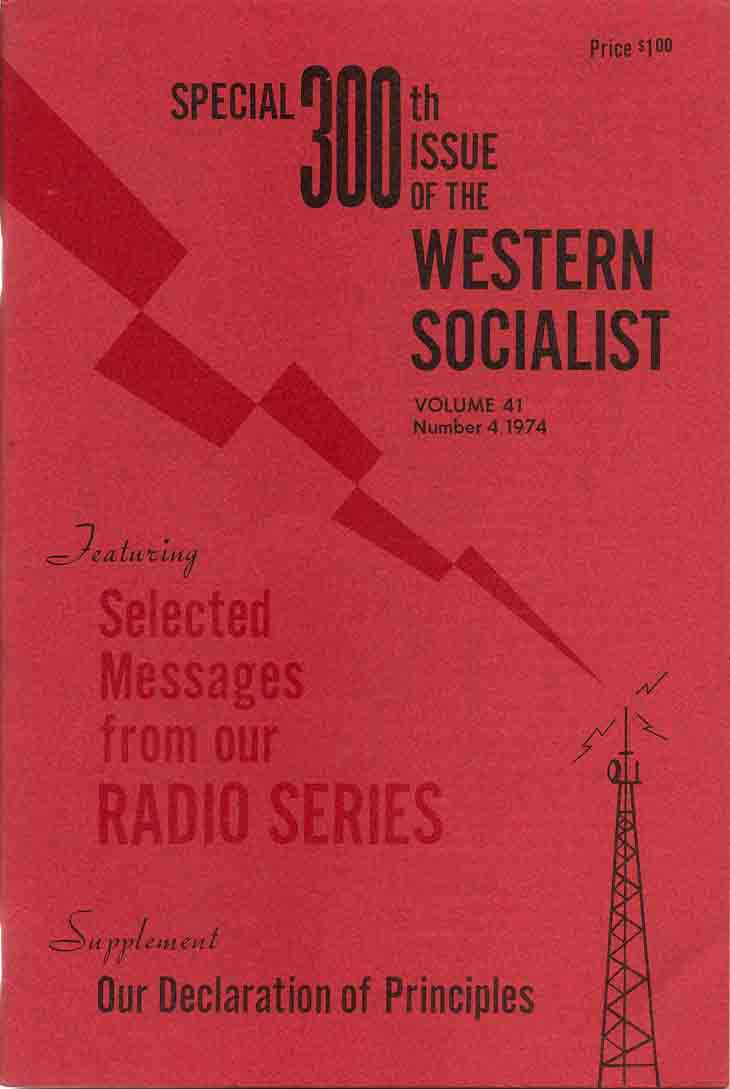
- Western Socialist 1974 Issue 300
- Frequency: Monthly (1933-june-1948) bimonthly (jul-aug-1948-197?)
- Publisher: Socialist Party of Canada, Socialist Party of Canada (WSM)
- Founded: 1903
- Final issue: 1980
- Country: Canada and United States
- Based in: Vancouver (1903), Winnipeg (1933–39, 1970s–1980), Boston (1939-1970s)
- Language: English
- ISSN: 0043-4191
- OCLC: 1589457

Western Socialist, Journal of Scientific Socialism in the Western Hemisphere was a regular magazine of the Socialist Party of Canada begun in 1903 then the Socialist Party of Canada (WSM) in 1933, becoming a joint publication with the World Socialist Party of the United States in 1939, before reverting to the Socialist Party of Canada in the mid-1970s and ceasing publication in 1980. Both parties involved were companion parties of the World Socialist Movement and later went on to co-operate on the World Socialist Journal published between 1984–1985.

== See also ==
- Socialist Standard
