= World Socialist Party of the United States =

- Founded: 1916 (110 years ago)
- Split from: Socialist Party of America
- Headquarters: Las Vegas, Nevada
- Newspaper: The Socialist (1929–1938); Western Socialist (1939–1970s); World Socialist Review (1986–2011)
- Youth wing: World Socialist Youth
- Ideology: Revolutionary socialism Classical Marxism; Impossibilism; Anti-Leninism
- Political position: Far-left
- International affiliation: World Socialist Movement
- Colors: Red

Website
- wspus.org

The World Socialist Party of the United States (WSPUS) is a socialist political organization that was established in Detroit, Michigan as the Socialist Party of the United States in 1916 and which operated as the Socialist Educational Society in the 1920s before being renamed the Workers' Socialist Party. The organization reemerged in the 1990s and exists today as the American companion party of the World Socialist Movement.

== Political philosophy ==
The WSPUS maintains that it has been unique in the history of American socialist and parties since its inception by maintaining the original conception of socialism as first propounded by 19th-century theorists such as Karl Marx, Friedrich Engels, Antonie Pannekoek and William Morris. Within this tradition, socialism is defined as a post-capitalist mode of production where the accumulation of capital is no longer the driving force governing production and where production is undertaken to produce goods and services directly for use.

=== Economics ===
The WSPUS defines socialism as a moneyless society based on common ownership of the means of production, production for use and social relations involving cooperative and democratic associations as opposed to bureaucratic hierarchies and companies. Additionally, the WSPUS considers statelessness, classlessness and the abolition of wage labor as components of a socialist society, characteristics that are usually reserved to describe a fully developed communist society, but that both Marx and Engels used to describe interchangeable with the words "socialism" and "communism".

The WSPUS condemns other parties that call themselves "socialist" for supporting causes within capitalism (such as the interests of labor within capitalism), which they see as being but one side of the same coin. The WSPUS criticizes them for being reformist and for abandoning the long-term goal of building socialism in favor of maintaining the capitalist mode of production tempered by a welfare state. The World Socialist Movement also criticizes "democratic socialists" and labor unionists for coming to define socialism as political struggle within capitalism as opposed to defining it as a system to replace capitalism. For instance, they criticize the Socialist Party USA for advocating policies like full employment instead of dealing with the structural issues of capitalism like questioning the need to retain wage labor in the first place. The WSPUS also contends that nationalization, state ownership and even decentralized-public ownership of industry is not socialism because capital, monetary relations, exploitation, wage labor and bureaucratic hierarchy still exist in such organizations and in most cases state-run organizations are still structured around generating profits.

The WSPUS advocates the abolition of all employment, which they argue is a modern form of slavery, as well as its replacement by a society of voluntary labor and free association that produces wealth to be distributed through channels of free and open access.

=== Politics ===
The WSPUS advocates a political revolution because it argues that as the state is the "executive committee" of the capitalist class, it must be captured by the working class to keep the former from using it against the will of the latter. It also condemns what it claims is the reformist nature of much anarchist activism. The WSPUS maintains that the revolution must be carried out by a willing majority organized without leaders, capturing the state by means of delegates elected solely to carry out the wishes of the majority to destroy the state by replacing it immediately with democratic control of the means of production across the entire country and indeed the entire planet.

It claims to have stood against all wars fought since its inception on the grounds that they always represent the economic interests of the owning class and never those of the working class. Unlike much of the left, it does not take sides in wars. For example, it did not call for a victory for the Vietnamese against the United States. It has opposed the traditional radical opposition to the (usually Republican) incumbent presidents (e.g. anti-Nixonism, anti-Reaganism, or anti-Bushism) arguing that the enemy of the working class is the entire exploitative social system based on ownership of the means of the production, not the presidents elected to run that system efficiently, as such opposition fosters the illusion of "better presidents" rather than an understanding of and opposition to the entire economic system based on an owning minority employing a non-owning majority to produce its profits.

== Organizational history ==
=== Formation ===
The Socialist Party of the United States (SPUS)—its name inspired by co-thinkers in the Socialist Party of Great Britain (SPGB) and the original (non-WSM) Socialist Party of Canada (SPC)—was established on July 7, 1916 by 42 defecting members of Local Detroit of the Socialist Party of America (SPA). Those leaving to found the new organization were encouraged by the rapid growth of the so-called Impossibilist movement in Canada and were deeply discouraged by the growing trend towards reformism in the SPA. Many founding members of the WSPUS were employed in the growing Michigan auto industry.

The group was initially headed by an immigrant from England named Adolph Kohn, who was later remembered by one factional opponent as a "mild-mannered, blue-eyed man with a vast memory" who was "textually brilliant in Marxist lore". Writing under the pseudonym John O'London, Kohn attempted to gather around him others opposed to the World War in Europe who felt that the pursuit of ameliorative reforms only served to bolster the capitalist system.

The SPUS participated in the left-socialist circles of the time, especially with the Michigan Socialists expelled from the SPA in 1919 who first helped form the Communist Party of America (CPA) and later formed the Proletarian Party of America. Groups were formed in New York City, Cleveland, Portland and San Francisco.

The Proletarian group and the SPUS split apart over support for the Soviet Union. The WSPUS applauded the Bolshevik's withdraw from the first World War, but felt that the new Soviet regime could only be state capitalist and hence should not be supported. The Proletarian Party, headed by Scottish emigrant John Keracher, regarded the Soviet Union as a workers' state which needed defending.

The WSPUS was given a regular page in the Western Clarion, the weekly paper of the original (non-WSM) Socialist Party of Canada, a publication which circulated broadly in American Left-socialist circles.

=== Development ===
Pressured by the Palmer Raids of January 1920 and threatened with trademark litigation by the SPA, the SPUS in the early 1920s as the Socialist Educational Society (SES). There were three locals in the SES period, located in Boston, Detroit and New York. The New York City local was the most active and events often included Louis Boudin as guest lecturer.

In 1927, the SES changed its name again to the Workers' Socialist Party (WSP).

The party published an irregular organ during the 1930s, The Socialist, which was launched in November 1929 and continued publication until July 1938.

The heyday of the WSP was 1930 and 1940s when it had perhaps 150 members. During that time, WSP members were quite active in the workers' movement, especially the United Auto Workers union which a number of WSP members helped form. WSP members were also active in the International Ladies Garment Workers Union and the International Typographical Union in New England.

Since October 1933, the Socialist Party of Canada had published the Western Socialist from Winnipeg. After the outbreak of World War II, the Western Socialist could not be published in Canada as an anti-war journal. Beginning with Vol. VI whole number 55, October 1939, the periodical was published in Boston and became the official organ of both the SPC and the WSPUS. Its final issue was Vol. XL, whole number 319, 1979–1980.

In 1947, the party's name was changed, this time to the present World Socialist Party of the United States.

During the 1980s, the party began to publish World Socialist Review, the first issue being dated 1986. World Socialist Review has been published irregularly since then.

=== Present ===
The WSPUS rejuvenated in the mid-1990s due to the emergence of the Internet.

As of September 2008, it has members scattered throughout the United States, including local branches in Boston and Portland as well as a regional branch in the area encompassing Detroit and Toledo, Ohio.

== Notable members ==
- Taffy Brown – Detroit Labor Journalist for Labor News Agency.
- Bill Davenport – founding Director of the United Auto Workers Education Department.
- Adolph Kohn – leading party member during the foundation period.
- J. A. "Jack" McDonald – former IWW, Industrial Worker Editor, Socialist Party of Canada member and owner of McDonald's Books (founded 1926; 48 Turk St., San Francisco); McDonald (sometimes spelled "MacDonald") published a periodical entitled On the Record.
- Frank Marquart – helped found the UAW, Education Director of the Briggs Local 313, Dissident against the Reuthers, author of An Auto Workers' Journal.
- Samuel Orner – former IWW Organizer, organized the 1934 New York Taxi Strike, served as the inspiration for Lefty in Waiting for Lefty.
- Bill Pritchard – former SPC member, Dockworker, founding member of the One Big Union (Canada), Defendant in the Winnipeg General Strike Trial, Mayor of Burnaby, BC.
- Issac Rab – active in Typographers Union as well as in Detroit and Boston socialist politics for 60 years.

== Publications ==
- The Socialist (1929–1938) (OCLC 61464206)
- Western Socialist Journal (1–40; 1939–1980)
- World Socialist Review No. 1 (1986) OCLC 20439828
- World Socialist Review No. 2 (1986)
- World Socialist Review No. 3 (1987)
- World Socialist Review No. 4 (1987)
- World Socialist Review No. 5 (1988)
- World Socialist Review No. 6 (1989)
- World Socialist Review No. 7 (1991)
- World Socialist Review No. 8 (1992)
- World Socialist Review No. 9 (1992)
- World Socialist Review No. 10 (1993)
- World Socialist Review No. 11 (1994)
- World Socialist Review No. 12 (1995)
- World Socialist Review No. 13 (1997)
- World Socialist Review No. 14 (1998)
- World Socialist Review No. 15 (1999)
- World Socialist Review No. 16 (2001)
- World Socialist Review No. 17 (2002)
- World Socialist Review No. 18 (2003)
- World Socialist Review No. 19 (2004)
- World Socialist Review No. 20 (2005)
- World Socialist Review No. 21 (2007)
- World Socialist Review No. 22 (2011)
- Role-Modeling Socialist Behavior: The Life and Letters of Isaac Rab by Karla Doris Rab (2011) ISBN 0557538521
- World Socialist Pamphlets:
  - How the drive for profit devastated our environment (2019)
  - Employment a form of Slavery? (2019)
  - Schauerte, Michael.Reflections of the American Way of Life (2019)
