= World Socialist Party of Canada =

The World Socialist Party of Canada (WSPC) was a political party active in the 1960s. It was formed by members who broke away from the Socialist Party of Canada in Vancouver over becoming members-at-large and the Ahrens-Cannon controversy. The WSPC was more active propagating socialism than the SPC's three official locals. For a few months, it probably had slightly more members than SPC. On 15 March 1970, the GEC passed a resolution "that the WSPC be informed it is unacceptable they join the SPC as anything other than new members". The resolution continued, that the applicant no longer belongs to the WSPC, or that the WSPC no longer exists. It was the beginning of the end for the World Socialist Party of Canada.
