= World Socialist Party of India =

Indian political party

- Leader: None
- Founded: 1995; 31 years ago
- Split from: Communist Party of India (Marxist)
- Headquarters: 257 Baghajatin 'E' Block (East), Kolkata – 700086
- Ideology: Impossibilism; Classical Marxism; Socialism
- International affiliation: World Socialist Movement (1995–2003; 2014–present)
- Colours: Red

Website
- worldsocialism.org/wspi

The World Socialist Party of India (WSPI) is an Indian political party founded in 1995.

== History ==
Founded in March 1995 in Calcutta by members of the Marxist International Correspondence Circle (May 1990) in collaboration with the Bengali language journal Lal Pataka group (January 1983), having broken away from the Communist Party of India (Marxist) in 1982, the WSPI inaugurated on 1–3 March 1995 in the Students Hall, College Squire, Calcutta.

Adopting the Object and the Declaration of Principles as laid down in 1904 by the Socialist Party of Great Britain (SPGB) as the basis, the party appreciated the SPGB for its opposition to the world wars on grounds of class and description of Russia in 1918 as "state capitalist". Like the SPGB, it has no leadership.

The party was founded with the help of the SPGB and formally established themselves as a companion party of the World Socialist Movement (WSM) in 1995. In common with other parties of the WSM, it was formed as a revolutionary party opposed to Leninism and seeking to win control of the state by parliamentary means in order to abolish it and establish socialism on a worldwide scale.

The party was the only WSM party in Asia until the 9th Annual Congress in February 2003 when it requested to affiliate to Socialist Studies which lasted for five years. This resulted in a split called the World Socialist Group who remained with the WSM. However, the party applied to rejoin the WSM and was ratified by Executive Committee of the SPGB on 5 May 2014.

== Pamphlets ==
- History of Economics and "Modern Economics" (2016)
- History of Universal Suffrage (2017)

== Bibliography ==
- Binay Sarkar (2007). A Socialist Critique of the BBC, Albert Einstein, Amartya Sen and Muhammad Yunus. Avenel Press. ISBN 81-902529-2-5.
- Adam Buick and Binay Sarkar (2009). Marxian Economics and Globalization. Avenel Press. ISBN 81-902529-5-X.
- Adam Buick and Binay Sarkar (2012). Marxism Leninism Poles Apart. Avenel Press. ISBN 978-93-80761-20-6.
