= 1958 Canadian federal election =

- March 31, 1958

265 seats in the House of Commons 133 seats needed for a majority
- Turnout: 79.4% (▲5.3 pp)
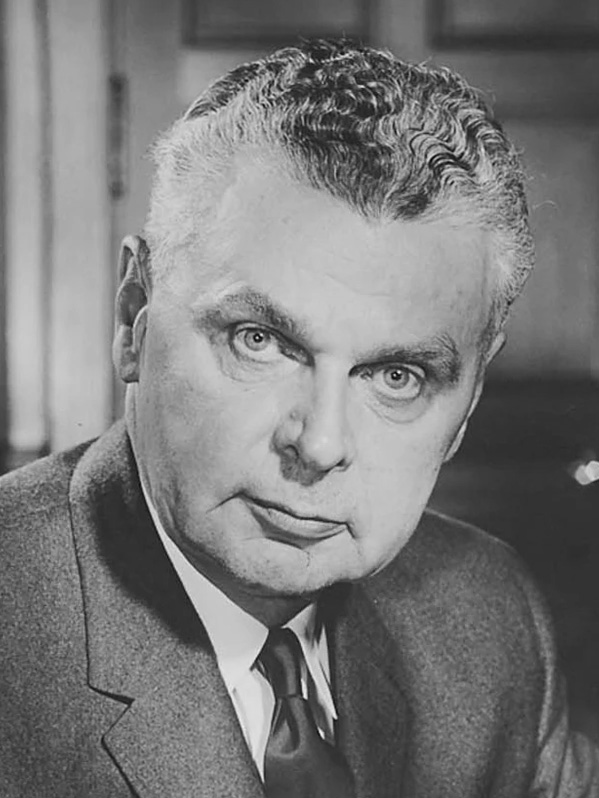

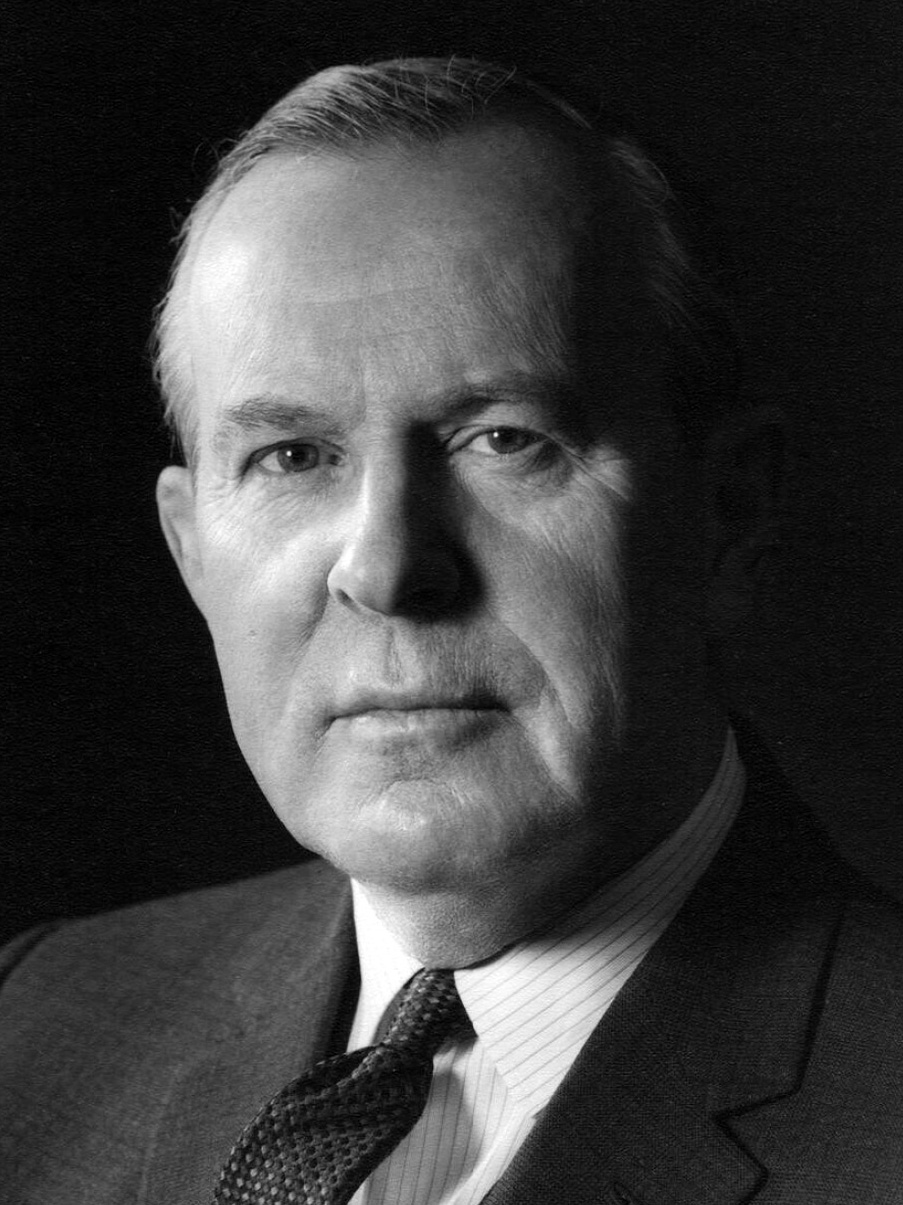

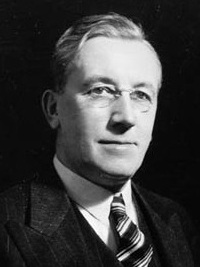

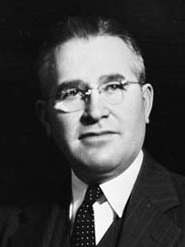
	First party	Second party
Leader	John Diefenbaker	Lester B. Pearson
Party	Progressive Conservative	Liberal
Leader since	December 14, 1956	January 16, 1958
Leader's seat	Prince Albert	Algoma East
Last election	112 seats, 38.50%	105 seats, 40.45%
Seats won	208	48
Seat change	▲96	▼57
Popular vote	3,910,852	2,459,700
Percentage	53.67%	33.75%
Swing	▲14.64 pp	▼8.58 pp
	Third party	Fourth party
Leader	Major James Coldwell	Solon Earl Low
Party	Co-operative Commonwealth	Social Credit
Leader since	March 22, 1942	April 6, 1944
Leader's seat	Rosetown—Biggar (lost re-election)	Peace River (lost re-election)
Last election	25 seats, 10.59%	19 seats, 6.54%
Seats won	8	0
Seat change	▼17	▼19
Popular vote	692,398	188,717
Percentage	9.51%	2.59%
Swing	▼1.08 pp	▼4.03 pp

- The Canadian parliament after the 1958 election
Prime Minister before election
John Diefenbaker
Progressive Conservative
Prime Minister after election
John Diefenbaker
Progressive Conservative

The 1958 Canadian federal election was held to elect members of the House of Commons of Canada of the 24th Parliament of Canada on March 31, 1958, just nine months after the 23rd election. It transformed Prime Minister John Diefenbaker's minority into the largest majority government in Canadian history and the second-largest percentage of the popular vote; only Unionist Prime Minister Robert Borden’s triumph in the 1917 federal election, at 56.93 per cent, was higher. Although the Tories would surpass their 1958-seat total in the 1984 election, the 1958 result (achieved in a smaller House) remains unmatched both in terms of percentage of seats (78.5%) and the size of the government majority over all opposition parties (a 151-seat majority). Voter turnout was 79.4%, the highest percentage of eligible electors to cast a ballot in Canadian federal election history.

== Overview ==
Diefenbaker called a snap election and capitalized on three factors:

- Nationally, the Liberals had just chosen a new leader, Lester Pearson, who had given an ill-advised maiden speech in Commons that asked Diefenbaker to resign and recommend the Governor General allow the Liberals to form a government without an election due to the recent economic downturn. Diefenbaker seized on the remark by describing a series of classified Liberal Cabinet documents stating that the economy would face a downturn in that year. This contrasted heavily with the Liberals' 1957 campaign promises. As election day drew near, the Liberals realized they had no chance of returning to power and hoped only to hold onto at least 100 seats. They were cut down to only 48, at the time the smallest seat count in their history.
- A turnaround in Quebec: Quebec had been largely Liberal since the Conscription Crisis of 1917, but upon the resignation of former Prime Minister Louis St. Laurent, the province had no favourite son leader, as they had since 1948, and its voters were open to new options. Seeking a greater voice in Ottawa, Quebec Premier Maurice Duplessis' Union Nationale used their party machine to ally with the Tories, allowing Diefenbaker's Progressive Conservatives to win two thirds of the seats in what had been a Liberal stronghold for a generation. While the Liberals finished only four percentage points behind the Tories in Quebec, much of their vote was wasted racking up large majorities in their traditional safest seats. Nevertheless, the 25 seats the Liberals won in Quebec accounted for more than half of their decimated caucus and, on a proportional basis, was their best performance after Newfoundland.
- A collapse in support for the Social Credit Party, which lost all 19 of its seats. While it took half the votes it had taken in 1957, third parties historically do not do well in landslides, especially in first-past-the-post voting systems. Prior to the 1957 election, the Socreds were seen as a credible threat to replace the Tories as the main right-wing party in the country, as they had done in British Columbia and Alberta, but the popularity of the Diefenbaker government persuaded many Social Credit supporters to abandon the party. That not only allowed the Tories to pick up Social Credit seats, but also proved decisive in many seats that were four-way races between the PCs, Social Credit, Liberals, and CCF. Notably, the Tories swept all seventeen seats in Alberta, where they had previously held just three seats to Social Credit's thirteen (and Liberal one seat). The election proved to be the start of a long decline for the federal Social Credit Party. It would never seriously challenge the PCs dominance again in federal politics (even in the West) although the BC Social Credit Party would govern that province for all but three years until 1991.

== Opinion polling ==
=== During the 23rd Parliament of Canada ===
Evolution of voting intentions at national level
Polling firm	Last day of survey	Source	PC	LPC	CCF	SC	Other	Undecided	ME	Sample
Election 1958	March 31, 1958		53.67	33.75	9.50	2.59	0.49			7,284,467
Gallup	March 1958		56	32	7	4	1	13	—N/a	—N/a
Gallup	January 1958		50	35	9	6	—N/a	—N/a	4.0	—N/a
Gallup	November 1957		50	33	9	7	1	—N/a	—N/a	—N/a
Gallup	October 1957		48	34	10	7	1	—N/a	—N/a	—N/a
Gallup	July 1957		47	35	10	8	—N/a	—N/a	—N/a	—N/a
Election 1957	June 10, 1957		38.50	40.45	10.59	6.54	3.92			6,680,690

=== Regional polling ===
==== Quebec ====
Evolution of voting intentions at provincial level
Polling firm	Last day of survey	Source	PC	LPC	CCF	Other	ME	Sample
Election 1958	March 31, 1958		49.6	45.6	2.3	2.5		
Gallup	March 1958		49	45	—N/a	—N/a	—N/a	—N/a
Gallup	January 1958		42	51	3	4	—N/a	—N/a
Gallup	November 1957		43	50	1	6	—N/a	—N/a
Gallup	July 1957		40	54	—N/a	—N/a	—N/a	—N/a
Election 1957	June 10, 1957		30.7	56.8	1.8	10.7		

==== Ontario ====
Evolution of voting intentions at provincial level
Polling firm	Last day of survey	Source	PC	LPC	CCF	Other	ME	Sample
Election 1958	March 31, 1958		56.4	32.1	10.5	1.1		
Gallup	January 1958		58	31	9	1	—N/a	—N/a
Gallup	November 1957		57	31	10	2	—N/a	—N/a
Election 1957	June 10, 1957		48.1	36.6	11.9	2.1		

==== Maritime ====
Evolution of voting intentions at regional level
Polling firm	Last day of survey	Source	PC	LPC	CCF	Other	ME	Sample
Election 1958	March 31, 1958							
Gallup	January 1958		57	40	2	1	—N/a	—N/a
Gallup	November 1957		61	37	1	1	—N/a	—N/a
Election 1957	June 10, 1957							

=== Western Canada ===
Evolution of voting intentions at regional level
Polling firm	Last day of survey	Source	PC	LPC	CCF	Other	ME	Sample
Election 1958	March 31, 1958							
Gallup	January 1958		44	20	19	17	—N/a	—N/a
Gallup	November 1957		45	17	17	21	—N/a	—N/a
Election 1957	June 10, 1957							

== National results ==

Party	Party leader	# of candidates	Seats			Popular vote		
Party	Party leader	# of candidates	1957	Elected	% Change	#	%	pp Change
Progressive Conservative	John Diefenbaker	265	111	208	+87.4%	3,908,633	53.66%	+14.85
Liberal	Lester B. Pearson	264	104	48	-53.8%	2,432,953	33.40%	-7.35
Co-operative Commonwealth	M.J. Coldwell	169	25	8	-68.0%	692,668	9.51%	-1.20
Liberal–Labour		1	1	1	0%	11,956	0.16%	-
Social Credit	Solon Low	82	19	-	-100%	188,356	2.59%	-3.99
Independent		9	2	-	-100%	14,211	0.20%	-0.87
Independent Liberal		10	2	-	-100%	12,054	0.17%	-1.25
Labor–Progressive	Tim Buck	18	-	-	-	9,769	0.13%	+0.02
Candidats des électeurs	Réal Caouette	1	-	-	-	8,276	0.11%	-0.01
Independent PC		5	1	-	-100%	2,097	0.03%	-0.19
Socialist		2	*	-	*	1,113	0.02%	*
Capital familial	H-G Grenier	1	*	-	*	968	0.01%	*
Radical chrétien		1	*	-	*	687	0.01%	*
Independent SC		1	-	-	-	361	x	-0.04
Ouvrier canadien		1	*	-	*	243	x	*
Independent Conservative		1	*	-	*	122	x	*
Total		831	265	265	-	7,284,467	100.00%	
Sources: http://www.elections.ca History of Federal Ridings since 1867

Notes:

"Previous" refers to standings at previous election, not to standings in the House of Commons at dissolution.

* The party did not nominate candidates in the previous election.

x - less than 0.005% of the popular vote

== Vote and seat summaries ==
Ternary plots - shift of electoral support (1957-1958)
1957

1958
Electoral districts identified by colours of winning parties

Popular vote
PC	53.67%
Liberal	33.75%
CCF	9.50%
Social Credit	2.59%
Others	0.84%

Seat totals
PC	78.49%
Liberal	18.11%
CCF	3.01%
Others	0.37%

== Results by province ==
Party name		BC	AB	SK	MB	ON	QC	NB	NS	PE	NL	YK	NW	Total
Progressive Conservative	Seats:	18	17	16	14	67	50	7	12	4	2	1	-	208
Progressive Conservative	Vote (%):	49.4	59.9	51.4	56.7	56.4	49.6	54.1	57.0	62.2	45.2	54.5	42.8	53.7
Liberal	Seats:	-	-	-	-	14	25	3	-	-	5	-	1	48
Liberal	Vote (%):	16.1	13.7	19.6	21.6	32.1	45.6	43.4	38.4	37.5	54.4	43.3	57.2	33.4
Co-operative Commonwealth	Seats:	4	-	1	-	3	-	-	-	-	-			8
Co-operative Commonwealth	Vote (%):	24.5	4.4	28.4	19.6	10.5	2.3	1.8	4.5	0.3	0.2			9.5
Liberal-Labour	Seats:					1								1
Liberal-Labour	Vote (%):					0.5								0.2
Total Seats		22	17	17	14	85	75	10	12	4	7	1	1	265
Parties that won no seats:
Social Credit	Vote (%):	9.6	21.6	0.4	1.8	0.3	0.6	0.7						2.6
Independent	Vote (%):			xx	xx	0.1	0.6							0.2
Independent Liberal	Vote (%):						0.6				0.2			0.2
Labor–Progressive	Vote (%):	0.4	0.3	0.1	0.4	0.1	0.1							0.1
C. des électeurs	Vote (%):						0.4							0.1
Independent PC	Vote (%):		0.1			0.1								xx
Socialist	Vote (%):					xx	xx							xx
Capitale familiale	Vote (%):						xx							xx
Radical chrétien	Vote (%):						xx							xx
Independent SC	Vote (%):		0.1											xx
Ouvrier canadien	Vote (%):						xx							xx
Ind. Conservative	Vote (%):											2.3		xx

xx - less than 0.05% of the popular vote

== See also ==
- List of Canadian federal general elections
- List of political parties in Canada
- 24th Canadian Parliament
