= Spanner (journal) =

- Language: English

Publication details
- Publisher: City and Guilds College Union (United Kingdom)

Standard abbreviations
- ISO 4: Spanner

Indexing
- LCCN: 74647313
- OCLC no.: 02239990

Spanner was a British journal on non-market socialism.

== History ==
In October 1987 the Guildford branch of the Socialist Party of Great Britain circulated a discussion document around the Party which was to create controversy. It arose from discussions within the Party as to how socialist society could be organised to most effectively solve the problems left by capitalism. The document, entitled "The Road To Socialism", questioned at a fundamental level the Socialist Party's established view of how socialism is likely to come about, labelling it the "Big Bang" theory of revolution. It argued that the Party needed to develop "a more sophisticated multi-dimensional model of socialist transformation which nevertheless incorporates the more useful insights of the old theory", but it was precisely what was meant by "multi-dimensional" that was to cause difficulties.

== Ideology ==
What Guildford had in mind was that the growing socialist movement would have a profound economic impact on the operation of capitalism before the overthrow of the capitalist class and the formal establishment of socialism. They claimed that socialists would use their influence politically (through the legislature and local councils) to adjust patterns of state income and expenditure in ‘socialistic’ directions, including the provision of free services. Drawing inspiration from writers like André Gorz, they also claimed that socialists would be encouraging the growth of the non-monetary, voluntary sector of the economy and should be instrumental in developing support networks for co-operatives and LETS schemes.

In short, Guildford's vision was a gradualist one in which the materialist conception of history as applied to the coming of socialism was turned on its head: the economic structure of society would be essentially transformed before the socialist capture of political power, rather than afterwards. In the Guildford scenario, the capturing of political power would merely be a mopping-up exercise, designed to dispense with the remaining capitalist areas of the economy.

== Reception ==
This critique of the Party's revolutionary strategy was vigorously rebutted in other circulars from branches and members and at Party conference, the Guildford perspective only receiving limited support from outside the branch itself. While most members readily acknowledged that the growth of the socialist movement would have profound and perhaps unpredictable impacts, and while it was the already established Party position that socialists would be organised on the economic front as well as the political front to ensure the smooth changeover of production and distribution from capitalism to socialism, this did not equate with seeking to mould capitalism into socialism from within, in a gradual way. As the Party had long attacked co-operatives and the idea that the state could increasingly give away services for ‘free’, the Guildford perspective made little headway and its critique was largely dismissed as a caricature of the Party's conception of socialist revolution.

== Aftermath ==
Nobody was expelled over the matter, though a small number of members resigned. They went on to publish the journal Spanner, so-called because it aimed to ‘span’ opinion across the non-market socialist sector of political thought, and in recent years some have been instrumental in founding the small World In Common group.
