= World Socialist Movement =

International organisation of socialist parties

- Founded: 1904; 122 years ago
- Newspaper: Western Socialist Journal (1933–1980); Socialist Comment (1944–1948); World Socialist (1983–1987, 2020–present)
- Ideology: Classical Marxism; Socialism; Impossibilism
- Colours: Red
- Slogan: World Socialism

Website
- worldsocialism.org

The World Socialist Movement (WSM) is an international organisation of socialist parties created in 1904 with the founding of the Socialist Party of Great Britain (SPGB).

The member parties share a common classical Marxist worldview and an adherence to socialism defined as a distinct economic system from capitalism. As a result, the parties of the WSM are held in sharp contrast to social democratic political parties and Marxist–Leninist movements. In contrast to social democratic parties, the WSM parties do not pursue social and economic reforms to capitalism, nor do they seek political office in electoral politics and they do not focus on so-called progressive causes, believing such actions to be irrelevant to their fundamental goal of socialism. In contrast to Marxist–Leninist communist parties, they do not subscribe to the theories of imperialism, vanguardism and democratic centralism, believing such practices to be antithetical to the realisation of socialism.

The WSM defines socialism as a moneyless society based on common ownership of the means of production, production for use and social relations based on cooperative and democratic associations as opposed to bureaucratic hierarchies. Additionally, the WSM includes statelessness, classlessness and the abolition of wage labor as characteristics of a socialist society—characteristics that are usually reserved to describe a communist society, but that both Karl Marx and Friedrich Engels used to describe interchangeable with the words socialism and communism.

== Object ==
The WSM sees its function as the proliferation of socialist ideas and the dissemination of structural analyses and critiques of capitalism as well as to correct misconceptions regarding socialism and to make people aware of the structural issues inherent to capitalism while facilitating open debate regarding the future organisation of a post-capitalist society.

== Positions ==
=== Capitalism ===
The WSM maintains that capitalism is a regressive and backwards system given modern civilisations' current level of technological and economic development. Regardless of how progressive capitalism becomes, it cannot meet the needs of the majority of the population and solve its inherent structural issues. The WSM as an organisation does not participate in labor union activity, social activism or progressive movements, although individual members may and are permitted to do so as long as they remain within the context of economic/social rather than political activism. The WSM perceives such activity (such as support for organised labour unions) to be within the scope of the current capitalist system and therefore insufficient for bringing about fundamental change in the structure of society because the demands of such activities are to reform capitalism.

The WSM is also differentiated from the majority of socialist parties that have become defined by their strategy and immediate demands—and in the case of social democratic parties—preoccupied with gaining and maintaining political office, adopting capitalist perspectives in the process.

=== Socialism ===
The WSM defines socialism in its classical formulation as a "system of society based upon the common ownership and democratic control of the means and instruments for producing and distributing wealth by and in the interest of the community". Socialism is characterised as a stateless, propertyless, post-monetary economy based on calculation in kind, a free association of producers (workplace democracy) and free access to goods and services produced solely for use and not for exchange.

=== Impossibilism ===
The WSM takes an anti-Leninist stance, arguing that a vanguard party and single-party state is antithetical to the development of socialism and prone to corruption. The WSM believes that socialism can only be achieved through mass support for socialism and educating the public toward that end and neither promotes nor opposes political reforms of capitalism (such as social democracy), criticising such reforms as being ineffective for promoting a fundamental restructuring of society toward socialism. The WSM is also opposed to a transition stage between capitalism and socialism, such as market socialism, arguing that such a transitional stage is no longer necessary given modern technology.

== Activity ==
Cover of World Socialist, issue 6 (winter 1986 to 1987)

The WSM's activities are solely based on the realisation of socialism and nothing unrelated else to socialism, such as social activism and campaigning for non-socialist, socially progressive causes that are irrelevant to socialism as a distinct system from capitalism.

The WSM do stand in elections on occasion as they believe that sending delegates to parliament is a useful tool within the socialist revolution as an additional measure along with a bottom-up reorganisation of society on the basis of socialism. This view places them within the context of Marxism and therefore distinguishes them from many anarchist organisations that may support the idea of socialism as the WSM sees it, but not the Marxist tactics they propose.

=== Publications ===
World Socialist (OCLC 474640161) was a bi-annual journal that was produced by the international from 1983 to 1987 and the international's only publication to date (World Socialism 69 was a multilingual publication by the Socialist Party of Great Britain). The Western Socialist Journal was published from 1933 to 1980, but from 1939 involved at least two companion parties in North America. Socialist Comment involved at least two companion parties in Australasia.

=== Radio ===
The World Socialist Party of New Zealand run Radio Imagine out of Manurewa, Auckland.

== Companion parties ==
All the parties began as offshoots from the Socialist Party of Great Britain. WSM members in countries without a companion party of their own are as a rule SPGB members. It is made up of the following parties:

Companion parties of the WSM
Country	Name	Founded	Misc.
Australia	Socialist Party of Australia	1930	Disestablished in 1970
Canada	Socialist Party of Canada	1931	
Ireland	World Socialist Party (Ireland)	1949	Disestablished in the 1990s
Great Britain	Socialist Party of Great Britain	1904	
India	World Socialist Party of India	1995	
New Zealand	World Socialist Party of New Zealand	1930	
United States	World Socialist Party of the United States	1916	

The following were companion parties of the WSM, but have disaffiliated or been expelled:

- League of Democratic Socialists (Austria)
- Socialist Party of North America (1911)

In 1979, a group used to exist in Sweden with the name World Socialist Group (Världsocialistiska gruppen). This group believed an altered version of the Object and Declaration of Principles of the Companion Parties of Socialism. It was not a political party, but it wanted there to be a socialist party in Sweden.

== See also ==
- Classical Marxism
- Communist society
- Libertarian socialism
- Orthodox Marxism
- Scientific socialism
- Socialism (Marxism)
- Socialist economics
