= 2ZY =

English radio station

2ZY was the name of a radio station established by the British Broadcasting Company in Manchester, England, in 1922. Part of the newly nationalised British Broadcasting Corporation from 1 January 1927, the station continued broadcasting under the 2ZY name until its transmissions came to be referred to, from 9 March 1930, as "the Manchester programme". Subsequently, on 17 May 1931, the Manchester station – broadcasting from a new high-powered station at Moorside Edge – became the main production centre of the newly launched BBC North Regional Programme, which was to remain on air until the outbreak of the Second World War in 1939.

2ZY aired its first test transmission on 450 metres on 17 May 1922 and regular broadcasting from the station started on 15 November 1922, just one day after sister station in London, 2LO, had begun transmitting daily programmes. On the same day, 5IT began in Birmingham and eight other stations opened in subsequent months across Britain. The frequency chosen for 2ZY was then 385 metres medium wave. The programmes were at first broadcast from the Metropolitan-Vickers electricity works in Old Trafford. The ornate iron water tower at the works was the site of the transmitter.

== Relays ==
From 1922 to 1924, all the programmes broadcast by these early stations were made locally as networking was not technically possible, but when quality improved the majority of output was provided by London. The idea of re-transmitting a service in a neighbouring area was tried in May 1924 when the Glasgow service from station 5SC was picked up and rebroadcast from a transmitter in Edinburgh. 2ZY became the first English station to do this when its signal was "relayed" to a transmitter covering Liverpool from 11 June 1924 (the station was called 6LV) and the Leeds/Bradford area on 8 July 1924 (station 2LS). Hull was next (station 6KH, from 15 August 1924) and Nottingham followed (station 5NG opened on 16 September 1924). The last of that period was a relay to the Stoke-on-Trent area (from station 6ST) which began on 21 October 1924. All these services carried the main output of 2ZY, which was the most relayed of all the early core BBC radio services: a useful practical experiment for BBC engineers of the day.

== Stereo ==
In July 1925, the BBC opened a much higher powered transmitter at Daventry which broadcast on 1562 metres longwave and was receivable across most of Britain. The station was called 5XX and it conducted its first experimental stereo broadcast from a concert in Manchester. (The 5XX longwave transmitter beamed the right hand channel and all the local BBC medium wave transmitters including 2ZY broadcast the left hand channel). A central Control Room was opened in Piccadilly Gardens in 1929 from where many network radio programmes were produced or broadcast. Radio plays and concerts were staged in an old converted repertory theatre hall in Hulme which was renamed 'The Radio Playhouse'.

== Orchestras ==
In order to fill the hours of airtime, Dan Godfrey Junior, 2ZY station manager, decided to create an orchestra of twelve players (the 2ZY Orchestra) specifically to perform for the station. He also instigated a chorus and an opera company for it. This enabled 2ZY to start a variety of regular live music broadcasts and this meant that a number of works by British composers, were given their first radio airing by the 2ZY Orchestra, including Elgar's Enigma Variations, Holst's The Planets and Elgar's The Dream of Gerontius. The 2ZY Orchestra was renamed the Northern Wireless Orchestra in 1926 which went on to play an important role in the formation of the BBC Philharmonic Orchestra.

== Closure ==
After the launching on 9 March 1930 of the BBC National Programme (and the consequent dropping of such "call signs" as 2LO), the BBC's service from the erstwhile 2ZY became known as "the Manchester Programme". With the opening on 17 May 1931 of a new high-powered station at Moorside Edge, the output from Manchester became the core of the BBC North Regional Programme. Under wartime conditions, the National and Regional Programmes were merged in 1939 into the Home Service.

== Inspired by 2ZY ==
In 2012, former BBC Radio Manchester Managing Editor, John Ryan, launched an independent production company called 2ZY.

== See also ==
- BBC Regional Programme
- List of oldest radio stations
- Moses Baritz
