= Socialist Party of North America =

- Founded: 1911
- Ideology: Anti-Leninism; Classical Marxism; Impossibilism; Socialism
- Colours: Red

The Socialist Party of North America (SPNA) was a political party founded in 1911 and the first in North America to adopt the Object and Declaration of Principles of the Socialist Party of Great Britain (SPGB).

The party was formed when the Toronto local of the Socialist Party of Canada (SPC) seceded in protest over that party's reformism. Its members had been influenced by Moses Baritz, a SPGB member resident in Toronto.

The SPNA survived for a few years, but failed to grow and the party was eventually dissolved in 1914. Many of its members rejoined the SPC.
