= Impossibilism =

Marxist school of thought emphasizing futility of capitalist reforms

Impossibilism is a Marxist theory that stresses the limited value of political, economic, and social reforms under capitalism. As a doctrine, impossibilism views the pursuit of such reforms as counterproductive to the goal of achieving socialism as they stabilize, and therefore strengthen, support for capitalism. Impossibilism holds that reforms to capitalism are irrelevant or outright counter-productive to the goal of achieving socialism and should not be a major focus of socialist politics.

Impossibilists insist that socialists should primarily or solely focus on structural changes (sometimes termed "revolutionary changes") to society as opposed to advancing social reforms. Impossibilists argue that spontaneous revolutionary action is the only viable method of instituting the structural changes necessary for the construction of socialism; impossibilism is thus held in contrast to reformist socialist parties that aim to rally support for socialism through the implementation of popular social reforms (such as a welfare state).

Impossibilism is the opposite of "possibilism" and "immediatism". Possibilism and immediatism are based on a gradualist path to socialism and a desire on the part of socialists to help ameliorate the social ills immediately through practical programs implemented by existing institutions including labor unions and electoral politics, thereby de-emphasizing the ultimate objective of building a socialist economy. This position is justified by the fact that socialists who embraced possibilism sounded and acted little different from non-socialist reformers in practice.

== Origins ==
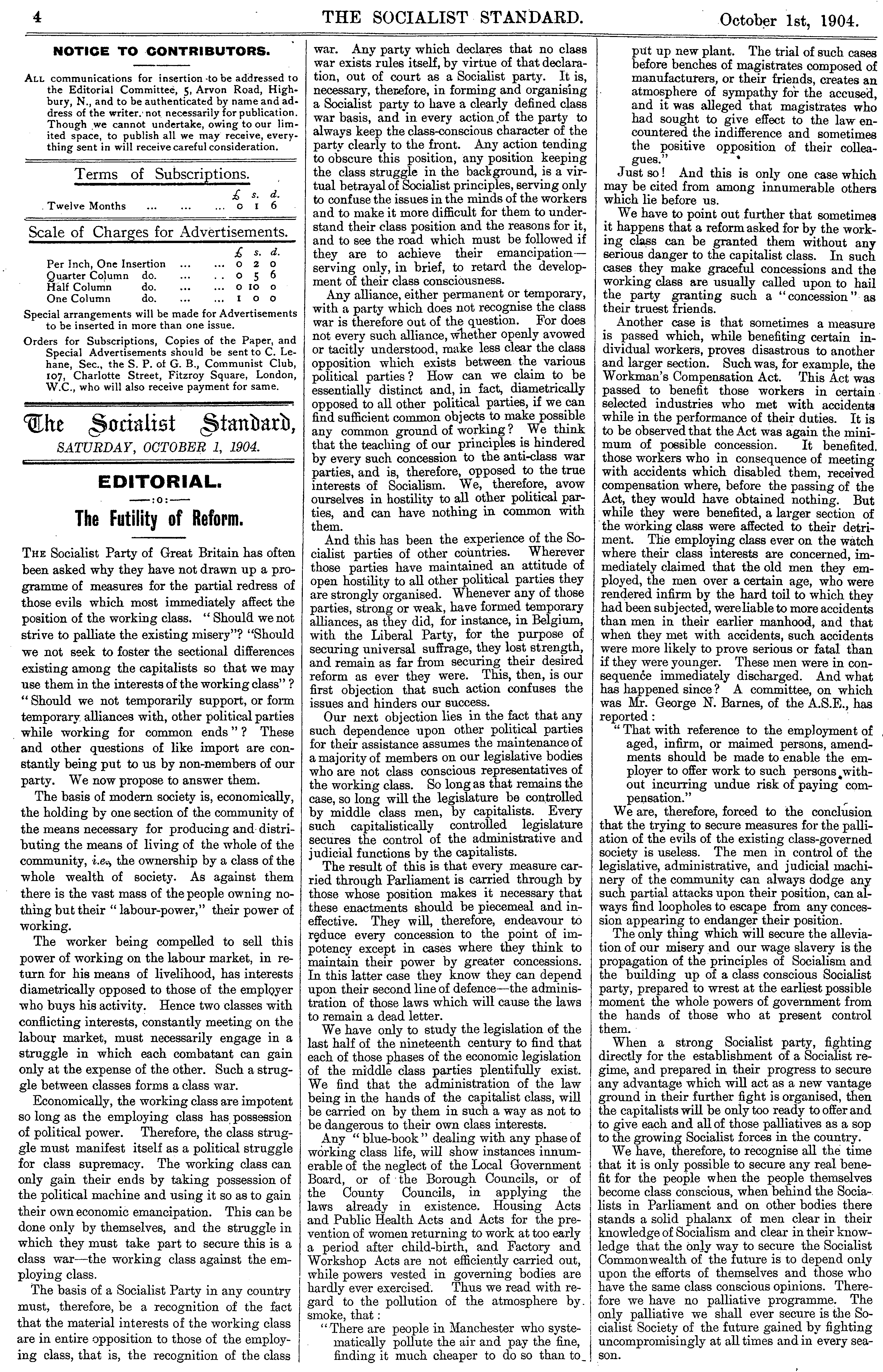
Editorial "The Futility of Reform" by Socialist Standard, October 1904

Karl Marx famously critiqued reformism and immediatist/possibilist goals advocated by modern social democrats in his Address of the Central Committee to the Communist League (1850). Specifically, he argued that measures designed to increase wages, improve working conditions and provide welfare payments would be used to dissuade the working class away from socialism and the revolutionary consciousness he believed was necessary to achieve a socialist economy and would thus be a threat to genuine structural changes to society by making the conditions of workers in capitalism more tolerable through reform and welfare schemes.

At the Paris Congress of the Second International in 1900, those who favored entry into government with all the implied compromises called themselves "Possibilists" while those who opposed them (those around Jules Guesde) characterized them as political "Opportunists". Conversely, the revolutionary socialists who opposed ameliorative reforms and participation in existing governments were called "Impossibilists" by their detractors because they allegedly sought the impossible by refusing to partake in the governing of capitalism.

While not usually described as an impossibilist, Rosa Luxemburg opposed both reformism and vanguardism, taking the more classical Marxist perspective that revolution would be a spontaneous reaction to underlying material changes in the productive forces of society. According to Luxemburg, "[political and juridical relations of capitalism] is not overthrown, but is on the contrary strengthened and consolidated by the development of social reforms and the course of democracy.".

== Political groups ==
- French Workers' Party
- International Communist Party
- Proletarian Party of America
- Social Democratic Federation
- Socialist Party of Great Britain
- Socialist Party of Canada
- Socialist Party of Canada (WSM)
- Socialist Labor Party of America
- World Socialist Party (Ireland)
- World Socialist Party of India

== See also ==
- Accelerationism
- Anti-Leninism
- Illegalism
- Left communism
- Libertarian possibilism
- Libertarian socialism
- Orthodox Marxism
- Possibilism
- Reformism
- Revolutionary socialism
- Revolutionary spontaneity
