= Socialist Party of Great Britain =

Socialist political party in the United Kingdom

- Abbreviation: SPGB
- Leader: None (Note: The party states that it is "democratic and leaderless".)
- Founder: Jack Fitzgerald
- Founded: 12 June 1904 (122 years ago)
- Split from: Social Democratic Federation
- Headquarters: 52 Clapham High Street, Clapham, London
- Newspaper: Socialist Standard
- Ideology: Impossibilism; Orthodox Marxism; Socialism
- Political position: Left-wing
- International affiliation: World Socialist Movement
- Colours: Red
- Slogan: World Socialism

Website
- Official website

The Socialist Party of Great Britain (SPGB) is a small socialist political party in the United Kingdom. Founded in 1904 as a split from the Social Democratic Federation (SDF), it advocates using the ballot box for revolutionary purposes and opposes both Leninism and reformism. It holds that countries which claimed to have established socialism had only established "state capitalism" and was one of the first to describe the Soviet Union as state capitalist. The party's political position has been described as a form of impossibilism.

== History ==
Delegates to the First Annual Conference of the SPGB in 1905

=== Origins ===
The SPGB was founded in 1904 as a split from the Social Democratic Federation (SDF) to oppose the SDF's reformism and as part of a response to that organisation's domination by Henry Hyndman (which also led to the SPGB's aversion to leadership). This split was also partly a reaction to the SDF's involvement in the Labour Representation Committee, which went on to found the Labour Party. It mirrored the split that led to the foundation of the Socialist League, stemming from an ongoing dispute within the socialist movement over tactics and the question of reform or revolution. The founders of the SPGB considered themselves to be part of a wider impossibilist revolt within the Second International. When in 1903 most of SDF members in Scotland broke away to form the Socialist Labour Party without contacting their fellow impossibilists in London, those impossibilists chiefly in Battersea branch decided to break away and form their own organisation, which they did the following year. Unlike the Socialist League, the SPGB advocated the revolutionary use of the ballot box and parliament.

=== Breakaway groups ===
There have been some event-specific debates, such as over the party's precise attitude to the Spanish Civil War in 1936, to the Hungarian Uprising of 1956 and then to the movements for political democracy in the Soviet bloc states in the 1980s. On other far fewer occasions, small groups of party members, sometimes concerned by the party's pace of growth (or lack of growth in some periods), have developed ideas which have challenged the party's basic core positions more clearly. Having initially agreed with the party's principles and analysis, they developed a political critique which challenged these positions at a more fundamental level. However, even in these instances only a handful of disputes have been so serious that they have led to organisational breakaways. The most notable of these are the Socialist Propaganda League, Harold Walsby's systematic ideology group, the Movement for Social Integration and the three groups which published Libertarian Communism, Spanner, and Socialist Studies.

== Ideology ==
=== Revolution ===
The party maintains that it is a revolutionary party and that it is committed to class struggle as the means of achieving its ends. However, that does not mean that they mean violence or civil war—as they note in their pamphlet Socialist Principles Explained:

The sort of bloody revolution that introduced capitalism in one country after another is out of date. Four main factors now make it essential to work for a revolution that is peaceful, democratic and which uses the voting system in those countries which have it:

- Most modern capitalist states are now so well-armed, so well informed and so wealthy and powerful that an armed insurrection trying to overthrow an established state machine would be doomed to failure.
- When violence has been used to establish a regime, it can only be maintained by violence or the threat of it (like capitalism). A socialist society cannot be built upon such foundations.
- There is no way of knowing, and showing, that such a violent revolutionary movement represents the wishes of the great majority. Many workers would oppose it simply because it was violent and destructive. Only a vote can prove that the majority insist upon the overthrow of capitalism.
- A sufficiently massive majority vote makes violence unnecessary because it demonstrates that opposition would be pointless.

They maintain that the only way socialism will come about is for a majority of people on a worldwide basis to believe in the superiority of this alternative social system. They endorse the theory of impossibilism and favour achieving this objective through the use of elections via an uncompromising policy agenda for socialism, although in the current situation their main function is as a propaganda group to try to raise consciousness and "make socialists". In contrast to Leninists, they believe that it is possible to make the transition from capitalism to the complete abolition of the state immediately that the majority decide to do it.

=== Socialism ===
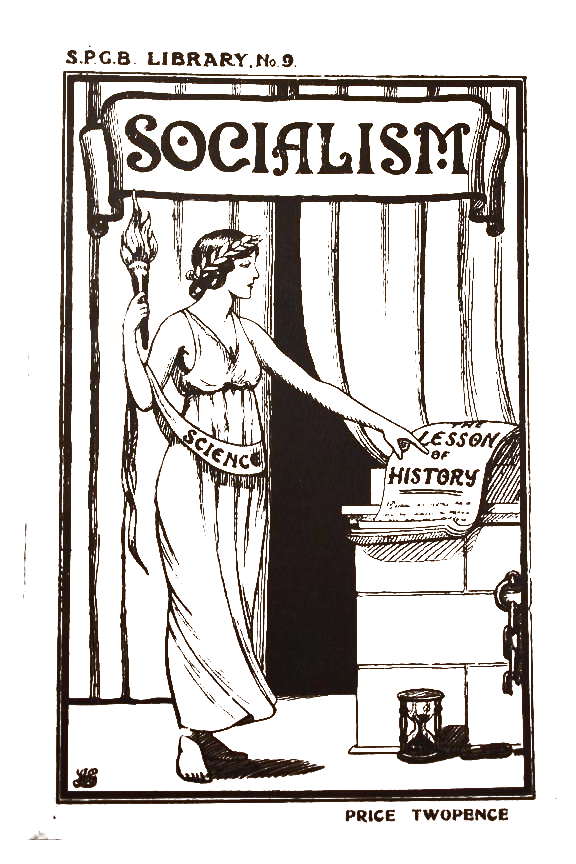
SPGB pamphlet in 1920

By conference resolution, the party's object must be printed on all literature it distributes as an indication of its importance. This object is the following:

The establishment of a system of society based upon the common ownership and democratic control of the means and instruments for producing and distributing wealth by and in the interest of the whole community.

Unlike similar formulations such as the Labour Party's original wording of Clause IV, it deliberately excludes the means of exchange. This highlights a central characteristic of the party as remaining advocates of socialism as a society in which the need for money is eliminated. As such, it rejects the argument that the economic calculation problem is a barrier to such a society. They claim this can be achieved through calculation in kind (i.e. technical planning based on real physical units of demand), a system of regulated stock control—much like that used in supermarkets—to ensure goods are replenished after they are taken and used by members of the community satisfying their self-defined needs and the principle of the law of the minimum. This was formally set out in the 1980s in their pamphlet Socialism as a Practical Alternative.

=== Marx ===
The SPGB report to follow Karl Marx's precepts because they are correct in their own right, sometimes quoting his own contention that Je ne suis pas marxiste ("I am not a Marxist"). However, they do often challenge the use of the term Marxist in the media, specifically when used to describe guerrilla and terrorist movements that have nothing to do with what the SPGB considers to be working class socialist emancipation.

=== State capitalism ===
The party rejects the idea that "socialism has existed before and has failed", holding to the view that those countries which claimed to have established socialism had in fact merely established state capitalism. SPGB members argue that socialism cannot exist in one country, but only on a global scale and that socialism will come about only when a majority of people want it and are prepared to organise politically to establish it.

Contrary to popular misconception, the SPGB did not "denounce the Russian revolution as state capitalist within hours of hearing of it". They initially praised the Bolsheviks for pulling Russia out of the Great War, but warned that given the low development of political consciousness in the largely ill-educated peasant based society, it could not be a socialist revolution, saying that "the franchise presents to the workers the way to their emancipation. Until the workers learn to use this instrument properly, they are not fit or ready for socialism". Their first reference to state capitalism was in fact a quote from Vladimir Lenin describing the state of affairs in Russia. The theory developed over time, emphasising the continued existence of wages and money in the Soviet Union to indicate that capitalism had not been abolished.

The major controversy within the party was over who constituted the capitalist class in Russia and the Eastern Bloc—with some taking the view that there were private capitalists and that capitalism in those countries was not distinct from its Western counterpart whereas others held that the state bureaucracy themselves were the capitalist class. This latter view won the day in a conference resolution in 1969:

This Conference recognises that the ruling class in state capitalist Russia stands in the same relationship to the means of production as does the ruling class in any other capitalist country, viz. it has a monopoly of those means of production and is therefore a capitalist class.

=== Fascism ===
Unlike other left groups, the SPGB did not see fascism as a special threat to the working class. Rather than formulating it as the last refuge of capitalism organising to defend itself against the working class, the party's writers and speakers tended to view it as a particular type of reform movement. The two specific characteristics identified were that it tended to be a form of national consolidation—unifying fragment nations such as Germany, Italy and Spain—and that it tended to have the mass support of the working class.

The party's theory made the working class the politically decisive class, therefore if the working class supported fascism, then fascism would prevail. Answers to letters in the Socialist Standard in the 1930s repeatedly made this point. Early writers noted what Benito Mussolini was able to do with the power of the state on his side, a part of a vindication of the SPGB's approach of the workers seizing control of the state. The SPGB therefore declined to join anti-fascist fronts or to make a particular issue of anti-fascism, arguing that the pro-socialist case was the necessary remedy for fascism.

=== Nationalism ===
The SPGB has consistently opposed nationalism of any sort throughout its history. The common argument used by SPGB members is that nationalism simply means favouring one set of rulers over another and that socialism is the only route to meaningful emancipation:

Before almost all else we Socialists are internationalists. We belong to the international working class. Our grievance is international; our only hope is international, and our enemy is international also.

The SPGB extended this internationalism to a rejection of national liberation struggles as futile wastes of workers' lives while world capitalism remains unscathed. For instance, they condemned the Irish Easter Rising and the struggle for liberation in Ireland.

=== Democracy ===
Although the SPGB is committed to using the ballot box for making its proposed revolution, it does so on a class basis—i.e. its concern with democracy is limited to having sufficient prospects of enabling the working class to make its revolution. The party thus does not enter in discussion over proportional representation, reforms to Parliament, or the House of Lords, because there is enough means within the current system for the working class to assert its will.

Arguments such as these were used to oppose the suffragettes and further that the precise reform that they called for meant the extension of the existing franchise to women, along with the then-existing property qualifications. The SPGB argued this would increase the size and weight of the capitalist class vote without advantage to the working class.

Into the 1920s and 1930s, the party did begin to argue that it was essential for workers to have sufficient "elbow room" in which to organise for socialist revolution—and so they favoured workers struggling for democracy and basic liberties. However, they did this with the proviso that socialists should not align themselves with any pro-capitalist factions to that end.

In the 1980s, this principle was extended to supporting the struggle for democracy in Central and Eastern Europe and particular Solidarity's struggle in Poland. The group of members who would go on to form the Socialist Studies group opposed this stance as a capitulation to reformism.

It consistently argues against vanguardism and denies the possibility of reforming capitalism in the interests of the working class. It refuses to engage in direct action or to co-operate with political parties that do not agree with the ideas set out in its founding document, the Object and Declaration of Principles. The SPGB and its companion parties in other countries constitute the World Socialist Movement.

=== Trade unionism ===
Trade unionism was a significant issue in the early years of the party. Several people who became members sent letters to Justice, the journal of the Social Democratic Federation, attacking trade union leaders and bureaucracy for their compromising stance, a line of criticism echoed by other impossibilists such as Daniel De Leon.

At the second conference of the party, a resolution was passed forbidding members from holding office in trade unions—although this was overturned by the EC as ultra vires and contrary to the declaration of principles. E. J. B. Allen continued to write articles attacking trade unions and supporting De Leonist-style socialist industrial unions. Such arguments were ultimately rejected on the grounds that a socialist union would have a tiny number of members so long as socialists remained in a minority, but when socialists attained a majority all unions would become socialist unions by having socialists members.

The agreed position was then to work within trade unions, but to also accept that they had different interests to political parties and to not try and take them over. Later, disputes arose as to whether trade union struggle could result in positive gains for the working class, or whether their role was purely defensive—the former view being taken by some members of the Ashbourne Court Group.

In the 1980s, the issue of trade unionism was at the heart of the decision to support Solidarity in Poland in their party's literature. Likewise, during the miners' strike of 1984–1985, the party walked a line between supporting the miners whilst simultaneously suggesting that they would not and could not win: "It is our job as socialists, then, to stand with our fellow workers in their necessary battles to defend themselves, but to point out at all times that the real victory to be achieved is the abolition of the wages system".

=== War ===
Since its foundation, the SPGB has opposed every war–including World War I and World War II. In its early years party writers frequently would contrast the numbers of dead in wars with the numbers killed and maimed in industrial incidents (by way of trying to contrast the passions and efforts put into war with the lack of response to the conditions of capitalism). The party argues that wars in capitalism were fought in the interests of the capitalist class and–as with their case against nationalism–the workers did all the dying for no gain for themselves. Second, that while the press and politicians tried to call for strike moderation, the capitalists would continue the class war despite hostilities, forcing down wages and up consumer good prices. During both wars some members won conscientious objector status.

In 1914, the banner headline of the Socialist Standard invited workers to join up–for the class war–as the only way of bringing peace and security. The magazine was in a list of works banned from sending to the front line (i.e. wholly censored).

The party came close to express support for the Republican cause of the Spanish Civil War on grounds of supporting defence of democracy (some writers initially took Spain as an example of what could happen if the capitalists class tried to use force to overturn the result of a socialist electoral revolution). This led to a debate within the party and resulted in an official statement that fell short of supporting the pro-capitalist republican government, but offering general support to workers in their struggle for democracy.

A similar dispute arose over World War II, with some members arguing that it was a war fought between totalitarian and democratic governments while many writers in the Socialist Standard sought to prove it was another trade-based war bred by the conditions of capitalism that socialists ought to oppose. This latter view won out and the party laid out three criteria by which it would support a policy:

- Has the proposed action the purpose of achieving socialism and will it achieve that result?
- Has the proposed action the purpose of safeguarding democracy and will it achieve that result?
- Has the proposed action the purpose of achieving an improvement in the condition of the workers and will it have this result?

As a result of press censorship during that war the work could not publish articles directly critical of the war. Instead it ran articles discussing ancient history, including the Peloponnesian War, as veiled allegories of the contemporary conflict. The Socialist Standard noted that "while we deeply regret having to adopt this course, we cannot see any workable alternative to it".

Since the party opposed nationalism and national liberation struggles, it has persistently refused to take sides in such wars as the Vietnam War and did not support the various insurgency elements in the Iraq War.

Its stance is one of immediate peace between nations, irrespective of national borders or other such outcomes (constructs). Party speakers do emphasise that the SPGB is not a pacifist party as it would countenance force being used to defend a socialist revolution. It generally has a nuanced criticism of nuclear weapon opposition.

== Constitution and structure ==
=== Membership ===
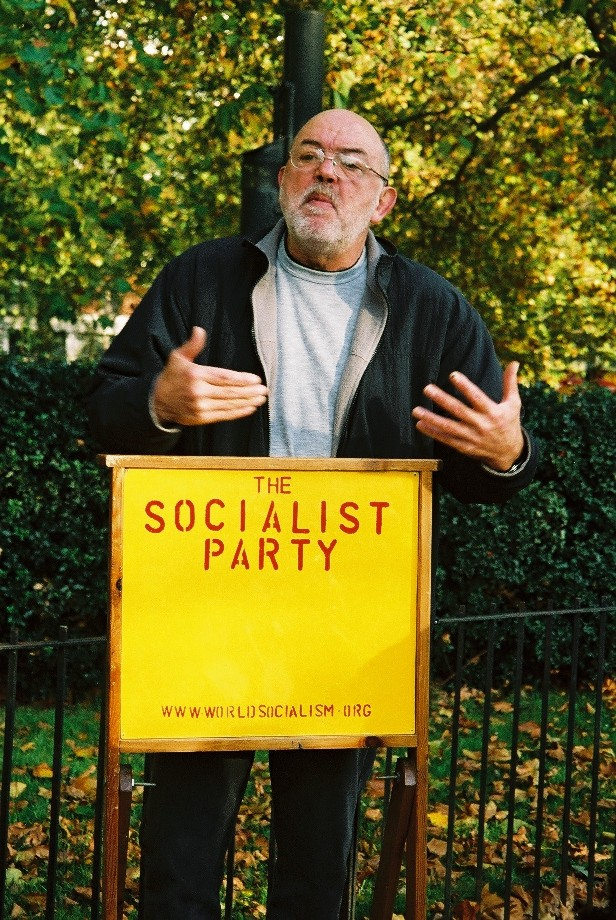
Arguing against capitalism, Speakers' Corner, 31 October 2004

Membership of the Socialist Party of Great Britain has been conditional on acceptance of the Party's Object and Declaration of Principles. All applicants for membership are required to undertake a short written or verbal 'test' designed to enable them to demonstrate an understanding of – and agreement with – this Object and Principles and also of the Party's basic political positions not otherwise directly covered in the Declaration. There has been a sound reason for this as all members, once admitted, have full democratic rights and stand in basic equality to one another. This kind of political democracy can only work on the basis of agreement around fundamental principles and, according to the Party, there would be no point in a socialist organisation giving full democratic rights to those who, in any significant way, disagreed with the socialist case.

=== Executive ===
One of the reasons the party split from the SDF was over the issue of leadership. Since its establishment in 1904, the SPGB has existed without any leader. The party has a ten-person executive committee, which is elected annually by a ballot of the whole membership and is charged with the day-to-day administration of the organisation. Its decision-making powers are tightly restricted and all substantial decisions are taken at the Annual Conference held each year at Easter.

== Current situation ==
The SPGB is vehemently anti-Leninist and protects its identity against the Socialist Party (SPEW), as the Trotskyist Militant group is now known. In propaganda and publicity material, the SPGB often styles itself as The Socialist Party whilst SPEW uses Socialist Party (without the definite article) and contests elections as Socialist Alternative.

The party was founded at an inaugural meeting of 142 members. In 2000, the party membership stood at around 500 (although there are some indications that the figure may now be lower). Around 150 members regularly take part in party elections and polls. As of 2022, the party's membership stood around 300.

In 2005, the party produced a film called Capitalism and Other Kids' Stuff.

As of 2022, the party was reported to have £2.6m in reserves: with a property worth £1,300,000, £800,000 in investment funds, and £400,000 in cash. The party spent £80,000 in 2021 on political activities, and £114,055 in 2022 for the same.

== Elections ==
The SPGB has contested most general elections since 1945, contesting one to ten constituencies. It has not yet obtained the post-1985: 5% of local votes threshold (nor pre-1985: 12.5%) to retain any political deposits. The party also occasionally fields candidates for European, Welsh and local elections.

Year	Candidates	Votes
1945	1	472
1950	2	448
1959	1	899
1964	2	322
1966	2	333
1970	2	376
1974 (October)	1	118
1979	1	78
1983	1	85
1987	1	81
1992	1	175
1997	5	1,359
2001	1	357
2005	1	240
2010	1	143
2015	10	899
2017	3	145
2019	2	157
2024	2	193

European Parliament elections
	Votes	%	Misc.
2014	6,838	0.04%	Contesting South East England and Wales
2019	3,505	0.02%	Contesting South East England

London Assembly elections
Year	Votes	%	Misc.
2024	3,721	0.15	Contesting Lambeth and Southwark (2,082) and Barnet and Camden (1,639)

Only the constituency vote was contested, not the regional vote. The percentage provided only refers to the overall constituency vote.

== Debates ==
Debates between the SPGB and other groups helped to bring the party's case to an outside audience without the sometimes off-putting rhetoric of platform speaking, or the one-sidedness of educational talks. In the course of the debates with the Revolutionary Communist Party (RCP) in the late 1940s, Sammy Cash persuaded the RCP's Jock Haston that the Soviet Union was state capitalist. The idea was then relayed to Tony Cliff, whence (in a somewhat different form) it formed the genesis of the British Socialist Workers Party. Richard Headicar, a former Campaign for Nuclear Disarmament speaker, was won over after debating with the party.

== See also ==
- List of Socialist Party of Great Britain members
- World Socialist Movement

== Bibliography ==
- Socialism or Your Money Back. The Socialist Party of Great Britain. 2004. ISBN 0-9544733-1-0.

=== Pamphlets ===
- Manifesto of the Socialist Party. Socialist Party of Great Britain. 1905. OCLC 474100463.
- Kautsky, Karl (1906). From Handicraft to Capitalism. Socialist Party of Great Britain. OCLC 1026924996.
- Morris, William (1907). Art, Labour and Socialism. Socialist Party of Great Britain. OCLC 958125810.
- Kautsky, Karl (1908). The Working Class. Socialist Party of Great Britain. OCLC 184847350.
- Kautsky, Karl (1908). The Capitalist Class. Socialist Party of Great Britain. OCLC 184780728.
- Socialism and Religion. Socialist Party of Great Britain. 1910. OCLC 244112800.
- Socialism. Socialist Party of Great Britain. 1920. OCLC 607317444.
- Beveridge Reorganises Poverty. Socialist Party of Great Britain. 1943. OCLC 3271448.
- Russia since 1917. Socialist Party of Great Britain. 1948. OCLC 30632199.
- The Case for Socialism. Socialist Party of Great Britain. 1962. OCLC 58592784.
- Women and Socialism. Socialist Party of Great Britain. 1986.
- Eastern Europe and the Collapse of the Kremlin's Empire. Socialist Party of Great Britain. 1991. OCLC 84019411.
