= The Advent (magazine) =

Magazine produced by the Sri Aurobindo Ashram

The Advent is a quarterly magazine produced by the Sri Aurobindo Ashram, and is "Dedicated to the Exposition of Sri Aurobindo's Vision of the Future".

== History and profile ==
The first issue of The Advent appeared on 21 February 1944. Early issues were printed in Madras, later on publication was relocated to the ashram at Pondicherry. The magazine is published in English on quarterly basis.

The Advent often featured material by Sri Aurobindo. Chapters VI to XII of The Synthesis of Yoga in their revised form first appeared serially from August 1946 to April 1948. Sections of Savitri were published in 1946 and 1947. A series of six articles from Sri Aurobindo's early writings (the Baroda period), comprising Philosophy of the Upanishads and one On Translating the Upanishads, appeared in The Advent in 1953. A number of aphorisms and later poems and also translations of a number of hymns to Indra (the latter was later published in The Secret of the Veda) have also appeared.

Nolini Kanta Gupta was the editor until he died in 1983 when M. P. Pandit took over. Samir Kanto Gupta is the present editor.

Other journals relating to Sri Aurobindo Ashram in Puducherry are Arya, Sri Aurobindo Mandir Annual, Sri Aurobindo Circle, Mother India World Union, Collaboration and Auroville Today.

== Selected articles ==
- Sri Aurobindo on the Ideal of Work. Indra Sen August 1945
- Is Sri Aurobindo a Mystic? Sisir Kumar Maitra August 1946
- Integral Yoga and Physical Immortality. T. V. Kapali Sastry - April 1948
- The Integral Autonomy of Being. Rishabhchand - November 1953
- East-West Synthesis in Sri Aurobindo. Indra Sen November 1954
- Concept of Man in Sri Aurobindo. Indra Sen April 1957
- The Integral Weltanschauung. V. Madhusudan Reddy - November 1963
- Integral Yoga of Sri Aurobindo and The Mother. Indra Sen August 1966
- The integral Personality. Indra Sen November 1966
- The Yogic Approach to Administration. Indra Sen February 1967
- Personality and integral Yoga. Indra Sen November 1967
- The Supramental Truth. Indra Sen April 1968

== Resources from the Internet Archive ==
- 1947, 361 pages
- The Advent Vol-ii No-3 (August 1945)
- April 1981
- Vol 24,25 1967
