= Judith Tyberg =

American yogi, Sanskrit scholar, and orientalist (1902–1980)

Judith Tyberg (1902–1980) was an American yogi ("Jyotipriya"), Sanskrit scholar, and orientalist. She authored The Language of the Gods as well as two other texts in Sanskrit. She was the founder and guiding spirit of the East-West Cultural Center in Los Angeles, California, an institution through which many Indian yogis and spiritual teachers of various Eastern and mystical traditions were first introduced to America and the West.

Judith Tyberg

== Early life as a theosophist at Point Loma ==
Judith Marjorie Tyberg was born on May 16, 1902, at Point Loma, the "California Utopia", which was the new world headquarters of the Theosophical Society. Katherine Tingley, world president, founded "Lomaland" in 1898, and Tyberg's Danish theosophist parents, Marjorie and Olaf Tyberg, were among the first joiners. In 1900, Tingley founded the Raja Yoga School. Tyberg recalled how, as young children, they were instructed in the works of the world's great religious and spiritual traditions and were inspired to seek "Truth, Justice, Wisdom ... more knowledge, more light". Early on, Tyberg displayed a serious and philosophical nature and a vocation for education. Madame Tingley called her "one of my true raja yogis". Tyberg grew up, studied, lived, and taught at Point Loma until its closing in 1942, and it was in this context that she knew orientalist Walter Evans-Wentz and Paul Brunton.

She received all her educational degrees from the Theosophical University: a B.A. degree in Higher Mathematics and Languages (Latin, Greek, Hebrew, German, Dutch, French, Spanish, Danish, and Swedish); an M.A. in Religion and Philosophy with a specialization in Oriental Thought; and a B.Th and M.Th in Sacred Scriptures and Ancient Civilizations, with a focus on the Bible and Kabbalah. Tyberg began her study of Sanskrit in 1930 with Gottfried de Purucker and received a Ph.D. in Sanskritic studies. She became a member of the American Oriental Society.

While still a teenager, Tyberg began her teaching career at the Raja Yoga School. She held the post of Assistant Principal of the Raja Yoga School from 1932 to 1935, became head of its Sanskrit and Oriental Division in 1940, and served as Dean of Studies as well as Trustee of the Theosophical University from 1935 to 1945. Starting in the late 1930s, she authored numerous articles on spirituality and consciousness for The Theosophical Forum magazine, including The Sacred Texts of the Gupta-Vidya, Possibilities of the Kali Yuga, Hinduism & Buddhism, and Where are your haunts of Consciousness? In 1934, Tyberg joined the team set up by de Purucker to create an encyclopedia of spiritual vocabulary used in theosophy, drawing from Greek, Chinese, Kabbalist, Zoroastrian, Hindu, and Buddhist texts. Tyberg's contribution was the exposition of over 2,000 terms.

== First Sanskrit works ==
Tyberg translated the Hymn to the Origin of the World from the Rig Veda and collated, edited, and prefaced Charles Johnston's 1946 translation of Shankaracharya's Crest-Jewel of Wisdom. In 1940, Tyberg published Sanskrit Keys to the Wisdom Religion, an exposition of over 500 Sanskrit terms used in religious, occult, and theosophical literature. This was a groundbreaking work by virtue of its content and its innovative printing technology, as it was the first time anywhere, including India, that the ancient form of Sanskrit was linotyped. Tyberg, in collaboration with Geoffrey Baborka, chief linotype operator at the Theosophical University Press, transformed a modern Sanskrit keyboard into a keyboard for the ancient form of the Devanagari alphabet, composed of dozens of matrices. Tyberg's view of Sanskrit's importance was quoted by the Los Angeles Times: "Not only are the languages used on the European and American continents deficient in words dealing with spirit, but many of the English words that do have spiritual connotations are so weighty with false and dogmatic beliefs that it is difficult to convey an exact meaning to all ... while Sanskrit expresses the inner mysteries of the soul and spirit, the many after-death states, the origin and destiny of worlds and men and human psychology." In 1941, Tyberg continued using her linotype innovation for the publication of the first edition of her First Lessons in Sanskrit Grammar. This was a revision of James R. Ballantyne's 1851 grammar, which Tyberg prepared in conjunction with Lawrence A. Ware of Iowa State University. Throughout her life, she reworked this text several times, subsequently republishing it in 1950, 1961, and 1977.

== India and meeting with Sri Aurobindo ==
In 1946, due to a schism within the California theosophical movement, Tyberg resigned from her dean and trustee positions at Point Loma. After a brief period of teaching at the University of Southern California, she went out on her own and opened a Sanskrit center and bookshop in Glendale, California. There, she taught Indian philosophy, religion, languages and culture. She continued lecturing at universities and associations, thus developing both her reputation and a large network of contacts with other orientalists. In 1946, Tyberg attended a lecture at the University of Southern California given by S. Radhakrishnan, then Vice-Chancellor of Benares Hindu University, following which Tyberg applied for a Sanskrit research scholarship at BHU. In her application letter and scholarship request, she stated: "I have decided to give my life to the spreading of the beautiful teachings and religious philosophy as found in Sanskrit scriptures ... and I would have the West illumined by its perfect philosophy." Explaining the "small means" earned from her teaching and lecturing, and her "simple way of living", she also expressed her belief that "when one dares and goes ahead with an unselfish heart and is convinced that the work is for the progress of humanity, help does come." The response was a three-year scholarship at the Oriental Division of Benares Hindu University, and Tyberg was made an honorary member of the All India Arya Dharma Seva Sangha.

Jyoti-Reading Sri Aurobindo

Jyoti Mantras-From Gita Chp 4

Jyoti Mantras-From The Rig Veda

Tyberg arrived at BHU in June 1947. At her first meeting, Tyberg chose the Vedic religious hymns for her Master's thesis topic. After a twenty-five-year study of humanity's sacred scriptures and seventeen years of Sanskrit, she was convinced that a deep but undiscovered spiritual secret was encrypted in the Vedas' archaic, complex language and that Western explanations of the texts were "nonsense". But, while the Vedas were accepted as the fount of India's spiritual culture, the current view, including in India, held that they were an interesting but "obscure, confused and barbarous hymnal". Tyberg's surprise and disappointment was great when she was thus informed that even the scholars at BHU knew of no one who could help her find this secret, if it even existed. She was advised to change her research topic.

Professor Arabinda Basu, then a young lecturer, overheard this exchange. He followed a crestfallen Tyberg into the corridor, quietly told her that there was someone who could help her and then gave her an as-yet unpublished manuscript of The Secret of the Veda by Sri Aurobindo, the revolutionary who, after a series of mystical experiences, renounced politics and founded an ashram in Pondicherry. Tyberg stayed up all night reading, and the next morning, told Basu that she'd found the object of her lifelong search for truth. On his advice, she wrote to Sri Aurobindo, asking for permission to come to see him.

The invitation that followed led Tyberg to spend two months in the Sri Aurobindo Ashram in Autumn 1947. On November 24, one of the four days annually when Sri Aurobindo broke his seclusion, Tyberg did her reverence to Sri Aurobindo and to his spiritual collaborator Mirra Alfassa, a Frenchwoman known as "The Mother". Tyberg's diary recorded her experience: "I just felt God", "electric forces", "stretched out to infinity", and "I really knew what was my soul." In a private audience with The Mother, Judith Tyberg asked to receive a spiritual name, which was chosen by Sri Aurobindo himself: "Jyotipriya, the lover of Light".

Back in Benares, Tyberg continued her studies in Sanskrit, Hindi, Pali, the Gita, the Upanishads, the Brahma Sutras, the Vedantic systems of philosophy and modern Indian thought, leading to an M.A. in Indian Religion and Philosophy. In March 1949, she wrote to Sri Aurobindo and The Mother: "I received the news that I had passed First Class in the M.A. examinations and had made a record for the university.... For the question 'State clearly and briefly the philosophical and religious views of Sri Aurobindo', I answered fully and enjoyed pouring out my soul in it."

Many eminent Indians, political leaders and yoga masters alike, were impressed with Tyberg's scholarship and her feeling for Indian culture: Mahatma Gandhi, Maulana Azad, V. K. Gokak, B. L. Atreya, Anandamayi Ma, Ramana Maharshi, Sri Ramdas, and Krishna Prem, and at the Sri Aurobindo Ashram: Kapali Shastri, Indra Sen, Sisir Mitra, Prithvi Singh, and former freedom fighters-turned-yogis Nolini Kanta Gupta and A.B. Purani, friends she referred to as "the cream of Hindu culture". Tyberg spent a week with the sage Ramana Maharshi at his Arunachala ashram where he told her "You're already realized, you just don't know it." Another lifelong friend was Swami Sivananda alongside whom Tyberg served as India's representative to the 1948 World University Round Table. Tyberg was the first President of the International Students Union, founded by S. Radhakrishnan, who called her "a real force in international understanding". Professor T.R.V. Murti declared "I am convinced that you are destined to play an important role in bringing the West and the East together on a spiritual plane."

In Autumn 1949, Tyberg went back to Pondicherry for a six-month stay as a disciple at the Sri Aurobindo Ashram. During her two years in India, Tyberg had kept up regular correspondence with an extensive network of American seekers. When certain people criticized this as unyogic, Tyberg asked The Mother for her view. Her reply was "How do you think the Divine works if he doesn't work through people like you?" and she repeated what she'd told Tyberg at their very first meeting: "You have chosen it, to serve, long ago." After a final reverence to Sri Aurobindo on February 21, 1950, Tyberg recorded her impressions: "Vast deep calm with a mighty wisdom ... his consciousness seemed infinite ... such currents!"

== The American Academy of Asian Studies ==
In April 1950, Tyberg took the boat from Calcutta to California, which included a stop in Hawaii. There she met her old Benares friend Charles Moore and discussed the results of his 1949 East–West Convention of Philosophers. From this, she gathered ideas for an approach to Sri Aurobindo that might readily appeal to the Western mind. Her arrival in Los Angeles was met with enthusiasm, and in just the first two weeks, she gave over ten lectures to more than 1,000 attendees. A similarly packed schedule was organized in San Francisco, where she received an enthusiastic reception at Stanford University. America was eager for "the uncensored truth about India" and, in Tyberg's words, California was "just teeming with interest in Sri Aurobindo". Then, in 1951, Tyberg was invited to join the faculty of the newly founded American Academy of Asian Studies in San Francisco. The AAAS was the first graduate university devoted to Asian culture, and was considered one of the "principal roots" of the 1960s' "San Francisco Renaissance". Tyberg held the professorship of Sanskrit alongside an international group of colleagues that included Alan Watts, Haridas Chaudhuri, and Dilipkumar Roy. Chaudhuri and Roy were fellow "ardent Aurobindonians" as was director of studies, Frederic Spiegelberg, who held Sri Aurobindo to be "the prophet of our age". Spiegelberg highly regarded Tyberg for her teaching approach, which took "Sanscrit as a life force underlying Indian thinking, past and present", and praised her "superior teaching abilities ... the way in which she understood to make every single class meeting a vitally interesting one". As an instructor in a Summer 1952 seminar on Modern India at San Francisco State College, Tyberg's teaching was noted as "exceptionally effective": "It is perfectly clear that she commands a tremendous range of knowledge and insight into the workings of modern Indian society based on both direct experience and extensive study." Tyberg also taught as a lecturer at Stanford University.

== The East–West Cultural Center ==
Chant-Jyoti with Trudi King

After two years at the AAAS, Tyberg returned to Los Angeles, where on May 1, 1953, she founded the East–West Cultural Center. In line with Sri Aurobindo's dictum "The Knowledge that unites is the true Knowledge." Tyberg intended the EWCC to be a "broad and non-sectarian" forum for building cultural reciprocity between East and West as well as presenting a variety of aspects of spiritual life. She single-handedly conducted classes in Sanskrit, Hindi, Pali, and Greek, studies in comparative religion and sacred scriptures, and the yoga of Sri Aurobindo and the Mother. Tyberg organized guest lectures on Indian art and culture, dramatic readings from Indian literary classics, concerts and dance performances. She inaugurated an Oriental Library and bookshop with resources on India's many yogic paths. In the isolationist atmosphere of the Korean War, where "those interested in spiritual things are very much in the minority", her activities were pioneering. From 1953 to 1973, Tyberg also operated "The East West Cultural Center School for Creatively Gifted Children", which received full accreditation by the Los Angeles and California school boards. The school promised cultivating "aesthetic and studious habits". In an echo of her Raja Yoga school training, Tyberg aimed at inspiring children with "the highest ideals" by focusing on their "god-like qualities". Tyberg singlehandedly taught all school subjects, as well as music theory and piano. Many of her graduates were accepted by leading colleges as much as two years in advance of public school students, and Tyberg's school is remembered by them as "a wonderful and unique opportunity".

When the Cold War Fifties gave way to the New Age Sixties, the many years of Tyberg's avant-garde efforts burst into bloom. With her "My Search for Universality" talks, she was hailed as "one of the South-land's great women leaders and lecturers". The East-West Cultural Center became known as the focal point for Southern California's spiritual activity and its auditorium on Sunday afternoons was the first US launching pad for yogis who went on to have "a huge impact on modern Yoga": Swamis Muktananda, Satchidananda, Chidananda, Ramdas and Mother Mirabai, Sikh, Sufi, and Buddhist masters from Sri Lanka, Japan, and Cambodia, as well as Indian cultural and political leaders. Tyberg invited noted Western mystics, occultists and astrologers such as Dane Rudhyar and Marie de Vrahnes from Lourdes as well as early health food proponents such as Bernard Jensen. Famed dancers Ruth St. Denis and Indira Devi performed on the EWCC's stage in those early years of America's spiritual flowering. It was Tyberg who arranged Swami Vishnudevananda's Los Angeles program during the time he was also a subject of the early medical research on the effects of meditation, conducted at the University of California, Los Angeles. American hatha yoga exponent Ganga White was one of the young seekers attracted to Tyberg's center. When, on February 28, 1968, The Mother inaugurated the new international spiritual township of Auroville, Tyberg was an ardent supporter of this spiritual adventure and served as an essential informational and connecting link. Tyberg was known for her "high ethical and spiritual ideals" and for her upright and "high-minded" character. Indian gurus sent their disciples to see her to "be benefited". However, if there was any insincerity or misrepresentation of India's spiritual light, Tyberg would be categorical and cut off all aid and connections immediately. "Never speaking against anyone, she would simply say 'I cannot disclose my reasons, but I assure you they are genuine.'" Part of her challenge and pedagogy was to lead seekers to be able to distinguish between low-level and often fraudulent "psychic phenomena" and the "true psychic" in Sri Aurobindo's description – the conscious evolution godwards of the soul. Anandamayi Ma dictated a 1959 message to Tyberg saying "how very pleased" she was about Tyberg's activities. Swami Sivananda wrote: "I greatly admire the solid work that you do for the spiritual good of mankind in a silent manner. This is dynamic Yoga. The whole of America will be grateful to you."

For Tyberg, the high point of the week was her Thursday evening spiritual satsangs where the focus was the in-depth teachings of Sri Aurobindo and The Mother, in her words "the highest path offered". She wrote to The Mother: "You must know how happy I am to have something so genuine to offer those seeking truth.... I just must share my great happiness and blessing with others." When she spoke, she said she felt a force that would come down in "great swirls" from above her head and get her "centralized to speak". A long-time devotee explained that Tyberg "did not interpret or ever become vague, or indulge in clichés, but seemed to identify so completely with Sri Aurobindo and The Mother that one felt continually their presence" and how during meditations with Tyberg "the force was so powerful' that his body would bend.

In her private office, Tyberg kept a framed personal message from the Mother: "For you who have realised your soul and seek the integral yoga, to help the others is the best way of helping yourself. Indeed, if you are sincere you will soon discover that each of their failures is a sure sign of a corresponding deficiency in yourself, the proof that something in you is not perfect enough to be all-powerful." There are strong indications in Tyberg's letter to the Mother of March 8, 1956, that she was one of the very few to have felt The Mother's February 29 Supramental Descent experience.

== The Language of the Gods and the last years ==
One of Tyberg's last works was The Drama of Integral Self-Realization, an illuminating and stirring summary of Sri Aurobindo's spiritual epic poem, Savitri, which appeared as a chapter in the 1960 publication, The Integral Philosophy of Sri Aurobindo: A Commemorative Symposium, edited by Haridas Chaudhari and Frederic Spiegelberg. In 1970, Tyberg published The Language of the Gods, her culminating opus on Sanskrit's "wisdom-treasury". This, along with her accompanying Sanskrit pronunciation tapes, capped 45 years of Sanskrit teaching and scholarship. Tyberg dedicated it "In Reverent Memory of Sri Aurobindo" and wrote in her preface: "In this age when men are responding to a spiritual need for unity and brotherhood among all the nations of the world, we find a spiritual vocabulary being drawn from the rich treasury of Sanskrit terminology because these words are already ripe with truths divine." In her "Plan of Study Recommended", Tyberg specified: "a stress has been given to the verb-roots of the words, for they are the essential carriers of the meaning of the words as originating in the spiritual element of the Universe" and in this way the student can "get at the real meaning of the word, free from the loaded implications that so many words have come to possess because of religious dogma and a misunderstanding due to lack of spiritual experience".

The book had a double introduction, by both B. L. Atreya and V. K. Gokak. Atreya praised the unique combination of Sanskrit and Hinduism, while Gokak lauded Tyberg's "ceaseless search for Truth" and her "burning desire to communicate to other aspirants what vision of Reality she herself attained through her study" of the mystical and philosophical terms which "help us to map out precisely the realms of the superconscient in man". The work was widely reviewed in India: The Indian Libertarian wrote: "Dr. Tyberg has woven for us a magnificent fabric of primary source materials of the highest authority," and The Indian Review hailed the "novel approach and sincerity of scholarship" ending with the words "Dr. Tyberg has laid all lovers of Sanskrit under a debt of gratitude." In Mother India, Sanat K. Banerji admired Tyberg's "boldness and originality" and particularly commended three major innovations: "within a reasonable compass, practically all the important terms that a students of (India's) most valuable works is likely to come across", the relating of "technical terms to the verbal roots from which they are derived" and the "signal service" that he felt must be emphasized: "Vedic interpretation has long suffered at the hands of scholars wholly ignorant of the spiritual endeavours the Vedas were meant to enshrine. The author has a valuable chapter on the Vedas and their spiritual meaning ... compiled from Sri Aurobindo's monumental work on the subject." The review finished with the words: "Dr. Tyberg has justified the name Jyotipriya given her by Sri Aurobindo."

In 1972, Tyberg's finances finally permitted a last trip to see The Mother on the occasion of the Sri Aurobindo Centenary celebrations. Despite the constant arthritic pain that afflicted her body, Tyberg kept "cheerfully going on" as she often said, managing the EWCC's rich diversity of activities while continuing to provide spiritual teaching and personal counselling, always for free. She accepted new professorships: at the College of Oriental Studies (1973), as Emeritus Staff Professor of Buddhist Studies at the Buddha Dharma University (1973), and as Professor of Sanskrit and Hinduism for the Goddard College Graduate Field Faculty (1975). One academic reference attested "Tyberg's lectures were distinguished by wide reading and research; and even more than this, she imparted to her students and hearers the spiritual aroma and inspiration of the great philosophical schools of the East." Tyberg often said that it was in the joy of teaching that she transcended all pain.

In 1978, Tyberg was able to make the ultimate mortgage repayment on the EWCC building and drew up a "guidance" letter of ideals and principles for EWCC's new board of directors "as the New Age unfolds": "This Center is not a business or a sect or a popular or social activity. It is a service to the Divine to share and unite the best aspects of the spiritual and religious, philosophical and cultural and healing arts of the East and West for uplifting and leading to a Divine Life on Earth.... May it continue to grow thus spontaneously with Divine backing with no catering to lower standards for attracting money."

Judith Tyberg expired on October 3, 1980. After a life where she sought "long service ... in search of truth, beauty and joy to share with all", her final aspiration was "the speedy return of my soul to the Divine ... so I may return again to serve the Light." Her Sanskrit books continue to be used as basic texts in Sanskrit classes, and the East West Cultural Center, the child of Tyberg's decades of pioneering and dedicated service, continues to exist as the Sri Aurobindo Center of Los Angeles.

== Bibliography ==
- Ashcraft, Michael (2002). The Dawn of the New Cycle: Point Loma Theosophists and American Culture. Knoxville, Tenn.: University of Tennessee Press.
- Aurobindo, Sri (1956). The Secret of the Veda. Pondicherry, India: Sri Aurobindo Ashram Trust.
- Aurobindo, Sri (1992). The Synthesis of Yoga. Twin Lakes, WI: Lotus Press.
- Banerji, Sanat K. (February 1972). "Books in the Balance". Mother India: Monthly Review of Culture. Pondicherry, India: Sri Aurobindo Ashram.
- Kapali Shastry, T.V. (1989) [1947]. Lights on the Veda. Pondicherry, India: Dipti Publications, Sri Aurobindo Ashram.
- Mandakini, (Shaw, Madeleine) (February 1981). "Jyotipriya (Dr. Judith M. Tyberg), Part 1". Mother India: Monthly Review of Culture. Pondicherry, India: Sri Aurobindo Ashram.
- Mandakini, (Shaw, Madeleine) (March 1981). "Jyotipriya (Dr. Judith M. Tyberg), Part 2". Mother India: Monthly Review of Culture. Pondicherry, India: Sri Aurobindo Ashram.
- Mandakini, (Shaw, Madeleine) (April 1981). "Jyotipriya (Dr. Judith M. Tyberg), Part 3". Mother India: Monthly Review of Culture. Pondicherry, India: Sri Aurobindo Ashram.
- Mandakini, (Shaw, Madeleine) (2011). "Jyotipriya, a Tribute". Los Angeles: Sri Aurobindo Center of Los Angeles.
- Sankaracharya, (translation by Charles Johnston) (1946). The Crest-Jewel of Wisdom. Point Loma, Calif.: Theosophical University Press.
- Small, Ken (September 2010). "Raja Yoga Education". Theosophy World. Online publication.
- Small, Ken (October 2010). "Raja Yoga Education". Theosophy World. Online publication.
- Tyberg, Judith (January 1938). "The Sacred Texts of the Gupta-Vidya". The Theosophical Forum. Pasadena, Calif.: Theosophical University Press.
- Tyberg, Judith (August 1938). "Possibilities of the Kali Yuga". The Theosophical Forum. Pasadena, Calif.: Theosophical University Press.
- Tyberg, Judith (1940). Sanskrit Keys to the Wisdom Religion. Point Loma, Calif.: Theosophical University Press.
- Tyberg, Judith (November 26, 1940). "Only Sanskrit Linotype made by Theosophists". San Diego Union. San Diego.
- Tyberg, Judith (March 1943). "Rig Veda X, 129". The Theosophical Forum. Pasadena, Calif.: Theosophical University Press.
- Tyberg, Judith (May 1943). "Where are your haunts of Consciousness?". The Theosophical Forum. Pasadena, Calif.: Theosophical University Press.
- Tyberg, Judith (March 1944). "Hinduism & Buddhism". The Theosophical Forum. Pasadena, Calif.: Theosophical University Press.
- Tyberg, Judith (1960). "The Drama of Self-Realization: The Spiritual Message of Savitri". In Chaudhari, H.; Spiegelberg, F. (eds.). The Integral Philosophy of Sri Aurobindo: A Commemorative Symposium. London, UK: George Allen & Unwin.
- Tyberg, Judith (1970). The Language of the Gods. Los Angeles: East–West Cultural Center.
- Tyberg, Judith (1977). First Lessons in Sanskrit Grammar and Reading. Pondicherry, India: Sri Aurobindo Ashram Press.
