= Rod Hemsell =

Rod Hemsell is an educator and an author who lived in Auroville and at the Sri Aurobindo Ashram from 1968 to 1983. During this time he also travelled widely and spoke about Auroville and Sri Aurobindo's philosophy at centers and universities in India, as well as publishing articles and essays.

He studied both philosophy and education at undergraduate and graduate levels, founded the GAIA Learning Center in Crestone, Colorado in 1991, and the GLOBE Charter School in Colorado Springs, Colorado in 1995, and was co-founder and executive director of the University of Human Unity project in Auroville, India, in 2007.

He gave a lecture and presentation on Savitri and participated in a panel on Auroville at the 1993 Parliament of the Worlds Religions in Chicago.

From 1994 he conducted annual Savitri Immersion workshops at the Sri Aurobindo Learning Center in Crestone. From 2007 to 2017 he lectured on philosophy at the University of Human Unity in Auroville, India.

== External links and essays ==
- Rod Hemsell (2002) Ken Wilber and Sri Aurobindo: A Critical Perspective mirror
- --- (2002) On the Divine Mother : A Mystery and Prophecy
- --- (2003) Essays for the New Millennium. 198 pp
- AUM 2005 panelist: Rod Hemsell
- --- (2008) The Poetry of Sri Aurobindo: Mantra, Metrics and Meaning (a monograph and course book of the University of Human Unity in Auroville) http://www.universityofhumanunity.org
- --- (2011) The Philosophy of Evolution: Darwin and Sri Aurobindo (a monograph and course book of the University of Human Unity in Auroville)http://
- --- (2014) The Philosophy of Religion - Hinduism, Buddhism, Christianity (an auro-ebook and University of Human Unity lecture series) http://www.auro-ebooks.com/philosophy-of-religion/
- --- (2017) The Philosophy of Consciousness: Hegel and Sri Aurobindo (an auro-ebook and University of Human Unity lecture series) http://www.auro-ebooks.com/philosophy-of-consciousness/
