= Mother India (magazine) =

Mother India is the Sri Aurobindo Ashram's originally fortnightly, now monthly, cultural review. It was started in 1948, the founding editor being K. D. Sethna (Amal Kiran), who continues as editor for over fifty years.

== History ==
Mother India began as a semi-political fortnightly, and needed Sri Aurobindo's sanction before material in it could be published. Although Sri Aurobindo himself did not write in Mother India, his interest in important issues of the time was reflected in the writings of his disciple Amal Kiran, the editor of the journal. For example, his message on Korea with its prediction of Stalinist communism's designs on South East Asia and India through Tibet, was originally sent in private to Amal Kiran and became the basis of one of the editorials. All the editorials were submitted to Sri Aurobindo for approval, and most were found to be impeccable, although on a few occasions small but significant changes were made. Sri Aurobindo once remarked in a letter to K.D. Sethna that he regarded Mother India as "my paper".

A number of early editorials have recently been collected and published in India and the World Scene (ISBN 81-7060-118-5) and The Indian Spirit and the World's Future (ISBN 81-7060-227-0)

== List of select articles ==
The following are some of the articles that have appeared in the journal.

The New Lead in Philosophy. Indra Sen November 1958
Grace and Self-effort in the Upanishads. Sisir Kumar Maitra Apr-May 1962
The Future Culture of India and the World. Indra Sen December 1966
History of The Future. M.S. Srinivasan June 2006

== See also ==
- Arya (journal)
- Sushila Rani Patel
- Filmindia
