= Pavitra (disciple) =

Desciple of Sri Aurobindo (1894–1969)

Pavitra (January 16, 1894 – May 16, 1969) (from the Sanskrit word for "pure") was one of the very early disciples of Sri Aurobindo and The Mother. The name was one of Srimati Radharani's 1000 names.

== Early life ==
He was born Philippe Barbier Saint-Hilaire in Paris. In 1914, he graduated from the Ècole Polytechnique with a degree in Engineering. He served in the army in World War I as an artillery officer, and after the war worked as a junior engineer in Paris, at the Ministry of transport and communication.

== Quest ==
He was interested in occultism, and in 1920 departed for Japan to study Zen Buddhism. In 1924, he left Japan and spent time with tantric lamas in monasteries in North China and Mongolia.

In 1925 Saint-Hilaire came to India and met Sri Aurobindo and The Mother in Pondicherry, where he was accepted as a sadhak, and Sri Aurobindo gave him the name Pavitra meaning "Pure". In 1951 The Mother appointed him director of the newly founded Sri Aurobindo International University Centre. He served in this position for 18 years, as well as being general secretary of the Sri Aurobindo Ashram, until his death in 1969.

== Death ==
The Mother reports in Agenda of May 1969 that Pavitra left his body in a yogic way and merged with her.

According to Satprem (see note to "On Pavitra and Pavitra's Death"), Pavitra left memoirs of his conversations with Sri Aurobindo and Mother in 1925 and 1926, large parts of which were destroyed (almost a third of Pavitra's notebooks) by his closest collaborator, with the pretext that it would be "better left unsaid". What was left was published as Conversations avec Pavitra.

== Partial bibliography ==
- L'évolution future de l'Humanité a compilation of texts by Sri Aurobindo (1962)
- The Message of Sri Aurobindo Ashram, Pondicherry, (1954)
- Conversations avec Pavitra. Paris: "Fayard". Sri Aurobindo Ashram Trust. Pondicherry, 1972
