= Sisir Kumar Maitra =

Indian philosopher (1887–1963)

Sisir Kumar Maitra (born 19 January 1887, Calcutta, India, died 1963) was Head of the Department of Philosophy and Dean of the Faculty of Arts, Banaras Hindu University. His writings compared Eastern and Western philosophy, and the teachings of Sri Aurobindo in comparison with Western philosophers.

== Life ==
Maitra was born into a Brahmin family, and as his father - who served as a Professor of English literature at the Dacca, Presidency and Ravenshaw Colleges - was very liberal in his views on social and religious matters, young Sisir was brought up free from social and religious orthodoxy. Maitra snr was also a great admirer of Rabindranath Tagore, and this was part of the intellectual atmosphere in which Sisir and his siblings lived.

In his college days he was for a short time a great admirer of Hegel. His faith in the supremacy of reason was shaken by the philosophy of Henri Bergson, to which he devoted several years of study. Later he discovered Sri Aurobindo, and in a number of books and essays helped popularise the vision of Sri Aurobindo among philosophical circles both in India and abroad, writing strictly from an academic philosophical point of view. The other philosopher who made a large influence on his mature thought was Nicolai Hartmann.

== Bibliography ==
=== List of books and some articles ===
- The Neo-Romantic Movement in Contemporary Philosophy, Book Company, Ltd., Calcutta, 1922
- "Outlines of an Emergent Theory of Values" in Contemporary Indian Philosophy, Ed. By S. Radhakrishnan and J.H. Muirhead, GA&UL- 1936/1958
- "The spiritual life and its realization", Calcutta Review no. 62, 1937, 65-71
- "Philosophy and life", Prabuddha Bharata (Calcutta), no. 43, 1938, 235-237
- "The philosophy of Sri Aurobindo", Prabuddha Bharata (Calcutta), no. 46, 1941: 113, 210, 261
- The Cosmic Significance of Karma in the Bhagavadgita Prabuddha Bharata, no. 44 February 1939, 60-71
- An Introduction to the Philosophy of Sri Aurobindo, First edition 1941 (Prabuddha Bharata, March). Calcutta 1941
- "Sri Aurobindo's conception of intuition", Prabuddha Bharata (Calcutta), no.47, 1942, 332 ff.
- "Self-effort of grace", Vedanta Kesari (Madras) no. 31, 1944–45, 8 ff.
- Studies in Sri Aurobindo's Philosophy, Banaras Hindu University, Banaras 1945
- The Nature and Function of Thought in Sri Aurobindo's Philosophy. The Advent November 1945 (or, Mitra?)
- The Spirit of Indian Philosophy. Prabuddha Bharata (Calcutta), no. 51, 1946, 258-268; Banaras 1947
- Meeting of East and West in Sri Aurobindo's Philosophy, Sri Aurobindo Ashram Pondicherry, 1956
- Sri Auroboindo and the New World. Pondicherry 1957
- "Sri Aurobindo and Spengler: comparison between the integral and the pluralistic philosophies of history", in H. Chaudhuri and F. Spiegelberg (eds.), The Integral Philosophy of Sri Aurobindo. George Allen & Unwin, London 1960; pp. 192–204
- The Shape of Things to Come as Envisaged by Sri Aurobindo. Loving Homage Sri Aurobindo Pathamandir Kolkata 1958
- Grace and Self-effort in the Upanishads. Mother India Apr-May 1962
- Sri Aurobindo and the Message of the Buddha. Sri Aurobindo Mandir 1965

=== Meeting of East and West in Sri Aurobindo's Philosophy ===
This work is a comprehensive introduction to Sri Aurobindo's philosophy in the context of mainstream academia. In contrast to other students of Sri Aurobindo, Maitra argues that western philosophical thought is essential if one is to understand the voluminous writings of Sri Aurobindo and The Mother.

Contents:
1. The Meeting of the East and the West in Sri Aurobindo's Philosophy (first appeared in The Advent November 1951, February, April, and August 1952)
2. Sri Aurobindo and Bergson (first appeared in Sri Aurobindo Mandir 1942)
3. Sri Aurobindo and the Problem of Evil (first appeared in Sri Aurobindo Mandir 1944)
4. Is Sri Aurobindo a Mystic? (first appeared in The Advent August 1946)
5. Sri Aurobindo and Plotinus (first appeared in Sri Aurobindo Mandir 1947)
6. Sri Aurobindo and Nicolai Hartmann (first appeared in Sri Aurobindo Mandir 1945)
7. Sri Aurobindo and Hegel (first appeared in Sri Aurobindo Mandir 1946)
8. Sri Aurobindo and Plato (first appeared in Sri Aurobindo Mandir 1950)
9. Sri Aurobindo's Vision of the Future (first appeared in Sri Aurobindo Mandir 1951)
10. Sri Aurobindo and Goethe (first appeared in Sri Aurobindo Mandir 1952)
11. Sri Aurobindo and Whitehead (first appeared in Sri Aurobindo Mandir 1955)
