= Indra Sen =

Indian Psychologist, Author, and the founder of Integral psychology (1903-1994)

Indra Sen (13 May 1903 – 14 March 1994) was a devotee of Sri Aurobindo and The Mother, psychologist, author, and educator, and the founder of Integral psychology as an academic discipline.

== Early life and education ==
Sen was born in the Jhelum District of Punjab (now Punjab, Pakistan) in a Punjabi Hindu family from Punjab, but grew up in Delhi when his family moved there. From a young age he was interested in the spiritual quest. He completed a master's degree in both Philosophy and Psychology at the University of Delhi.

To further his studies, he enrolled at the University of Freiburg, in Germany, and obtained a PhD in Philosophy. He also attended the lectures of Martin Heidegger and taught Indian Philosophy and Sanskrit at the University of Koenigsberg. At this time, his main interests were Hegel's philosophy, and Jung's psychology. He later returned to the University of Delhi. In December 1933 he met Jung when the latter visited Calcutta for the Indian Science Congress. Sen went on to become President of the psychology section of the Indian Science Congress, and was also a recipient of the Eastern-Western psychology lecture award of the Swami Pranavananda Psychology Trust

== Career ==
In 1945, Sen left his university post and joined his family at the Sri Aurobindo Ashram. In following years, through lectures, published writings, and personal contacts, he presented Sri Aurobindo's work to academia and universities, where it became well known for the first time.

In a series of professional papers published from the mid-1930s through the 1940s and 1950s, he coined the term Integral psychology, to describe the psychological observations contained in Sri Aurobindo's Yoga psychology and philosophy. He also was concerned with the formulation of integral education as presented in the teachings of Sri Aurobindo and The Mother.

His papers, which were sent to Sri Aurobindo and later The Mother before publication, were presented at scientific congresses or published in Ashram journals. It was not until 1986 that these papers were published, by the Sri Aurobindo International Centre of Education in book form, as Integral Psychology: The Psychological System of Sri Aurobindo. This has since been issued in a second edition. The field of Integral psychology was later taken up and developed by Haridas Chaudhuri when he founded the Integral Counseling Psychology program at what is now the California Institute of Integral Studies, in the 1970s.

Another of Sen's tasks was to develop three centres for the ashram under The Mother's supervision. One was at Jwalapur, near Haridwar, and the other two in the Kumaon Hills – "Mountain Paradise", an orchard, and "Tapogiri", a place for sadhana (spiritual practice). The last mentioned especially, he was very committed to.

In all of Sen's work, themes of integral and wholeness were very important, and he frequently used terms like "Integral Culture" and "Integral Man". He observed that in Indian psychology "the theoretical and the practical motives of life are combined" and was critical of psychoanalysis for not being interested in the problem of emotional life as a whole.

== Bibliography ==
- Sen, Indra, The integration of the personality. Indian J. Psychol. 1943 18 31–34.
- – -- A Psychological Appreciation of Sri Aurobindo's System of Integral Yoga. Sri Aurobindo Mandir 1944
- – -- Education and Yoga. Sri Aurobindo Mandir 1945
- – -- Sri Aurobindo on the Ideal of Work. The Advent August 1945
- – -- The urge for wholeness. Indian J. Psychol. 1946 21 1–32.
- – -- Ideals of Indian Philosophy and Educational Life. Vedanta Kesari 1949–50
- – -- Personality and integral Yoga. J. Educ. & Psychol. 1951 9 88–93
- – -- Sri Aurobindo's Theory of the Mind. Philosophy East and West 1952 – and Das, A.C.
- – -- The Pursuit of Philosophy. Sri Aurobindo Mandir 1952
- – -- East-West Synthesis in Sri Aurobindo. The Advent November 1954
- – -- The Yogic Way. Basant 1957
- – -- Concept of Man in Sri Aurobindo. The Advent April 1957; World Union July–Sept 1968
- – -- Sri Aurobindo as a World Philosopher. Philosophy East and West 1957–58
- – -- Reflections on Sri Aurobindo. Pioneer of the Supramental Age 1958
- – -- The New Lead in Philosophy. Mother India November 1958
- – -- The Integral Yoga of Sri Aurobindo as a Contemporary Contribution to Indian Psychology. Mother India February 1959
- – -- The Integral Yoga and Modern Psychology. Basant 1960
- – -- Soul in Ancient and Modern Thought. Jr. Yoga Inst. 1962
- – -- Integral Yoga of Sri Aurobindo and The Mother. The Advent August 1966
- – -- The integral Personality. The Advent November 1966
- – -- The Future Culture of India and the World. Mother India December 1966
- – -- The Pathways to Perfection, the Integral Way. Srinvantu February 1967
- – -- The Yogic Approach to Administration. The Advent February 1967
- – -- Intellectual Activity under Spiritual Auspices. Srinvantu April 1967
- – -- Personality and integral Yoga. The Advent November 1967
- – -- The Supramental Truth. The Advent April 1968
- – -- The Integral Culture of Man. World Union April–June 1970; Unesco Declaration 1970
- – -- Sri Aurobindo and The Mother; Meditation and Allied Methods – Compilation
- – -- Integral Psychology The Psychological System of Sri Aurobindo (In Original Words and in Elaborations), Sri Aurobindo Ashram Publications Department, Pondicherry, 1st edition 1986; 2nd edition 1999 ISBN 81-7058-540-6
