= Sri Aurobindo Circle =

Annual periodical of the Sri Aurobindo Ashram

Sri Aurobindo Circle is an annual periodical of the Sri Aurobindo Ashram that was originally published in Bombay, but later from the Pondicherry ashram. It was established in 1945. During 1947 instalments of Savitri were published in it. As with other ashram journals it contained, besides the writings of Sri Aurobindo, essays and poems written by his disciples and devotees and by students of his thought.

== Resources from the Internet Archive ==
- Sri Aurobindo Circle, first Number,1945
- Sri Aurobindo Circle, second Number,1946
- Sri Aurobindo Circle, fifth Number,1949
- Sri Aurobindo Circle, sixth Number,1950
- Sri Aurobindo Circle, sixteenth Number,1960
