= Ambulal Purani =

- Born: Ambulal Balkrishna Purani; 26 May 1894; Surat, British India
- Died: 11 December 1965 (aged 71); Pondicherry, India
- Writing career
- Period: 20th century

Ambulal Balkrishna Purani (26 May 1894 – 11 December 1965) was an Indian writer. He was a prominent disciple and biographer of Sri Aurobindo.

== Life and work ==
Purani was born on 26 May 1894 in Surat (now in Gujarat, India). A nationalist activist as a young man, in 1923 he joined Sri Aurobindo Ashram on being convinced by Sri Aurobindo that he need not worry about the freedom of India as it was sure to come in time. He was a personal attendant to Sri Aurobindo from 1938 to 1950.

His work, most notably The Life of Sri Aurobindo and Evening Talks with Sri Aurobindo, constitutes one of the main sources on the life and sayings of this guru. He travelled extensively to give lectures on the yogic teaching of Sri Aurobindo, visiting the United States in 1962. Some of the lectures are available in book form which include major works like Savitri and the Life Divine.

His Evening Talks throws a major light on the personality of the great master Sri Aurobindo and his multifaceted knowledge. Lectures on Savitri gives a brief idea about the great epic Savitri.

He wrote a biography of Manilal Dwivedi entitled Manilal Dwivedinu Jeevancharitra (1951).

Purani died from heart attack on 11 December 1965 in Pondicherry, India.

== Publications ==
- The Life of Sri Aurobindo. Pondicherry: Sri Aurobindo Ashram, 1958.
- Evening Talks with Sri Aurobindo. Pondicherry: Sri Aurobindo Ashram, 1959.
- Lectures on Savitri: lectures delivered in the United States. Pondicherry: Sri Aurobindo Ashram, 1967.

== See also ==
- List of Gujarati-language writers
