= Xu Fancheng =

Xu Fancheng (Chinese: 徐梵澄), Courtesy name Jihai (Chinese: 季海) (26 October 1909, Changsha - 6 March 2000, Beijing), also known as Hu Hsu and F.C. Hsu in India, was a Chinese scholar and translator, indologist and philosopher. He translated 50 of the Upanishads into classical Chinese. He also translated Nietzsche's Also sprach Zarathustra, Kalidasa's lyric poem Meghaduuta (Cloud Messenger), and several of Sri Aurobindo's works into Chinese. He was familiar with Greek, Latin, English, French, as well as Sanskrit and German. A 16-volume edition of his complete works was published in 2006.

== His life and studies ==
He was born into a wealthy family in Changsha, Hunan. His name was "Hu"(琥) by birth. Fancheng is his Pen name. The childhood of Xu was marked by a complete study of Classical Chinese. He was taught by the student of the late Qing dynasty Confucian scholar Wang Kaiyun. He was a friend and student of Lu Xun in his early life. From 1927 to 1929, he studied history at Zhongshan University and then Western Literature in Fudan University. He studied Fine Art and Philosophy at the University of Heidelberg, Germany from 1929 to 1932. From 1945 to 1978, he studied and taught in India, thus escaping the Cultural Revolution. He moved to Pondicherry in 1951 where he met Mirra Alfassa (also known as the Mother) and joined the Sri Aurobindo Ashram. Xu Fancheng was provided an independent house by the Mother near the beach, where he translated and printed various Indian texts such as the Bhagavad Gita, various Upanishads, and most of Sri Aurobindo's major writings. He was also an accomplished painter in the Chinese style. He offered more than 300 paintings to the Mother which are still preserved in the Ashram. After returning to China in 1978, he worked as a professor at the Chinese Academy of Social Sciences, and all his works were collectively published in 16 volumes in China.

Xu was an acquaintance of Lu Xun. His study in Königsberg was at first inspired by Lu's advice. Throughout his entire life, his academic achievement and his fame were not proportionate. Partly due to the fact that Xu did not have any student to succeed in his study. Xu possessed the ability to translate Sanskrit texts into Classical Chinese while both languages are archaic and not commonly spoken by people in India and China.

== Legacy ==
Xu's translations were little known in China in the past, but today there is a growing interest in his writings and through them in Sri Aurobindo's philosophy and vision. In 2006 Xu's Collected Works were brought out by some of his students and colleagues and in 2009 the China Daily reported on his "unending search for spirituality". In 2010 there was an exhibition in Auroville and Pondicherry to commemorate his centenary. Around the same time some Chinese nationals, inspired by his writings, came to visit the Ashram and Auroville. In 2017 Luo Zhaohui, the Chinese ambassador to India and a former student of Xu Fancheng, came for a visit and was especially interested in seeing his 300 paintings. Later on in a speech he greatly appreciated Xu's work and his merits, calling him one of the bridges between China and India. In 2018 there was an exhibition and symposium on Xu in Pondicherry, inaugurated by Lao Zhaohui. The ambassador was accompanied by some prominent scholars, and various notable speakers addressed the audience.

== Literature ==
- F.C. Hsu (1978). Chinese Words. An Analysis of the Chinese Language. An Etymological Approach. Pondicherry, Sri Aurobindo International Centre of Education.
- Devdip Ganguli (2018). The Life and Legacy of Xu Fancheng - a Spiritual Bridge between India and China. Sraddha, Sri Aurobindo Bhavan, Kolkata, Nov. 2018, pp. 130–139
- Essays on XuFancheng (2018) - Compilation of the essays by renowned scholars from the event "symposium in memory of XuFancheng" (March 10, 2018), Pondicherry, event by Pondicherry India-China Friendship Association jointly with Embassy of the People's Republic of China in India, Sri Aurobindo Ashram Pondicherry, INTACH Pondicherry, C3S and India-China Friendship Association Tamilnadu Unit.
- " Remembering Xu Fancheng: A Cultural Bridge" by BIKASH KALI DAS. News from China, China-India Review Vol. XXXII | Special edition. page 98-100
