= Champaklal =

Champaklal Purani (February 2, 1903 – May 9, 1992) was an Indian man who served as the personal attendant to Sri Aurobindo and Mirra Alfassa for over fifty years.

== Life ==
Champaklal arrived at Pondicherry in 1921. From 1926 until 1938, he was the only other person apart from the Alfassa to see Sri Aurobindo on a daily basis.

Champaklal helped devotees seeking the Alfassa's blessings and other tasks. He painted also, encouraged by Alfassa.
