= Ganapati Muni =

Indian poet (1878-1936)

- Born: Ayyalasomayajula Surya Ganapati Sastry; 17 November 1878; Kalavarai, Vizianagaram
- Died: 25 July 1936 (aged 57); Kharagpur
- Occupations: scholar, poet
- Parents: Narasimha Sastry (father); Narasamamba (mother)
- Website: http://kavyakantha.arunachala.org

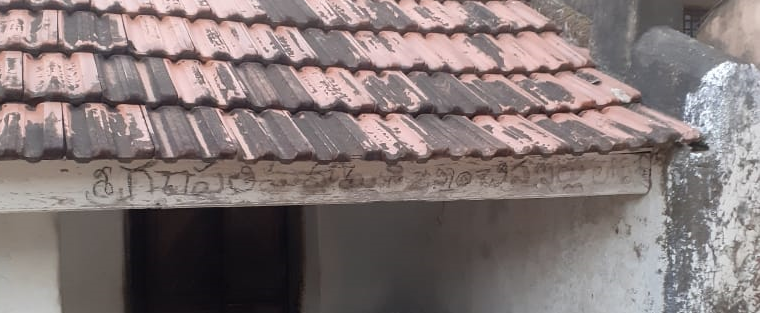
Ganapathi Mahamuni Birth place In Logisa Agraharam

Ayyalasomayajula Ganapathi Sastry, also known as Ganapati Muni (1878–1936), was a disciple of Ramana Maharshi. He was also variously known as "Kavyakantha" (one who has poetry in his throat), and "Nayana" by his disciples.

== Biography ==
Ganapati Muni was born in Logisa Agraharam near Gajapathinagaram in Andhra Pradesh on 26 November 1878. His parents, Narasimha Sastri and Narasamamba had three sons, Muni being the second. Ganapati, when 18 years old, set out and wandered from one place to another, residing in places like Bhuvaneshwar, where he performed his tapas. When Ganapati was staying in Varanasi he learned of an assembly of Sanskrit scholars in the city of Nabadwip in Bengal. He participated in it and on passing the tests in extempore Sanskrit prose and poetry, was conferred the title 'Kavyakantha'. He was then 22 years old. He returned home at the age of 25. From Kanchipuram he came to Arunachala (Tiruvannamalai) in 1903 to perform tapas. At that time he visited Ramana Maharshi, who was then known as Brahmanaswami, before he accepted a teaching post in Vellore in 1904. He wrote his devotional epic hymn "Uma Sahasram," One Thousand Verses on Uma (goddess Parvathi), after accepting Ramana Maharshi as his Guru on 17 November 1907. He also met Sri Aurobindo on 15 August 1928. Ganapati Muni died at Kharagpur on 25 July 1936.

== Influence ==
Ganapati Muni's teachings are laid out in his magnum opus, 'Uma Sahasram' and other works like 'Mahavidyadi Sutras'. They helped to reduce popular prejudice about the teachings of Tantra.

His students include T.V. Kapali Sastry.

== Literary works ==
- Umasahasram
- Muni, Gaṇapati (2004). Śrīramaṇagītā (9 ed.). Tiruvannamalai, India: Sri Ramanasramam. ISBN 9788188018185. An anthology of the teachings of Ramana Maharshi, along with English translations.
- Herambopasthaanam - Poem on Lord Ganesha
