= Filmindia =

Indian cinema magazine

filmindia
- Early ad of Mughal-E-Azam from Filmindia March 1946
- Editor: Baburao Patel
- Staff writers: Sushila Rani Patel (as Judas, Hyacinth)
- Frequency: Monthly
- Publisher: Baburao Patel
- Founder: Baburao Patel
- Founded: 1935
- Country: India
- Based in: Bombay
- Language: English

filmindia is an Indian monthly magazine covering Indian cinema and published in English language.

Started by Baburao Patel in 1935, filmindia was the first English film periodical to be published from Bombay. The magazine was reportedly run "single-handedly" by Patel, who wielded power through this medium to "make or destroy a film". Its most popular column was "The Editor's Mail" answered by Patel. The magazine featured film news, editorials, studio round-ups, gossip, and reviews of different language films, mainly from Hindi and regional cinema and affiliated reviews from Hollywood. His articles included siding with the lesser known cinema workers like the technicians, extras and stuntmen.

Patel met the painter S. M. Pandit around 1938, and asked him to design the covers for filmindia. One of Pandit's assistants, Raghubir Mulgaonkar, was also a designer in the same periodical. Both of them worked with Patel at filmindia through the 1930s and 1940s.

The magazine "created a sensation" on its launch with its "canny mix of rumour and review, observation and opinion" and Patel became a "celebrity" equal to the film stars he wrote about. The magazine reading target was the "elite readership", including college going youth. Termed a status symbol with college students, actor Dev Anand said of his Lahore college days, "boys in the campus used to carry copies of filmindia along with their textbooks. It was their Bible". Ramachandran and Rukmini state that "filmindia was the only magazine that counted in those days". It remained in publication from 1935 to 1961.

== History ==
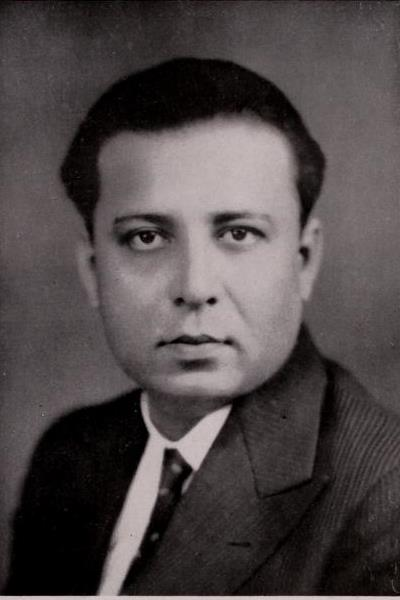
Baburao Patel (1904–1982) from filmindia January 1938

The first film periodical "exclusively devoted to cinema" was established in India in 1924, with the Gujarati magazine Mouj Majah by J. K. Dwivedi. Its success began a trend with the Bengali language Bioscope, published by Shailjananda Mukherjee in 1930, Filmland an English language weekly published from Bengal since 1930, and the Hindi Chitrapat in 1934, by Hrishamcharan Jain from Delhi.

In 1935, on his thirty-first birthday, Baburao Patel (1904–1982), started filmindia, with a small 'f' in the name, which was published initially by D. K. Parker and B. P. Samant and edited by Patel. "The very first issue of filmindia became a huge success and Patel gradually took over the monthly journal" making filmindia achieve "an unprecedented cult status". The magazine remained in publication till 1960, when Patel's interest in nationalism and politics made him launch "a national magazine" called Mother India. Patel found it difficult to run two periodicals simultaneously and he made the decision to shut down filmindia and focus on Mother India.

The magazine focused not only on Indian cinema but also published critical commentary on politics. It reviewed about 49 films annually on an average, out of which 31 were claimed to be poor, 13 indifferent and about 5 watchable films. It had monthly sales of about 32,000 copies. filmindia was one of the few Indian fan magazines sold in Western countries.

Filmindia ended publication in 1961. It had its Indian publication office in Bombay and had offices both in Calcutta and London.

== Contributors ==
- Sushila Rani Patel (Patel's second wife) and Baburao Patel also wrote under the pseudonyms "Judas" and "Hyacinth", both producing almost entire content for the magazine. As Judas they wrote the column called "Bombay Calling". And as Hyacinth, Sushila Rani conducted interviews with film personalities.
- K. A. Abbas was the chief film critic at one of the then popular newspapers, termed a "nationalist" daily, The Bombay Chronicle. Abbas wrote columns frequently for filmindia.
- Affiliated reviews: "Review From New York" by P. S. Harrison (editor: Harrison's Reports)
- Habib Tanvir described his meeting with Patel and how he was asked to meet him at his office, which led to him becoming an assistant editor of filmindia, "I was the first assistant editor of filmindia- of which I was quite proud- and the last".

== Influence ==
- Patel and Abbas were renowned as "important cinema commentators and experts" and considered themselves as "political activists". Their concern about cinema's influence on "nation and nationalism" made them launch a combined nationwide campaign against "anti-Indian" films in 1938. These included "empire films" like The Drum (1938) directed by Zoltan Korda, and Gunga Din (1939) directed by George Stevens, which according to them "reinforced imperialist stereotypes of the colonized as racially inferior, weak subjects". According to Mukherjee, "the matter was discussed in the central assembly..., Patel wrote telegrams to Indian ministers". He became the first critic who was invited as a "delegate to read a paper on Cinema and Culture, the first to voice a protest against anti-Indian productions in Europe, UK and USA". On 1 September 1938, "hundreds came out on the streets of Bombay to protest the release of The Drum at the Excelsior and New Empire Theatres. The film was withdrawn by its Bombay distributors on 14 September 1938".
- Patel and Abbas set up the Film Journalists' Association (FJA) in 1939.
- Studios such as Bombay Talkies, New Theatres Ltd, and Rajkamal Kalamandir were favourites with Abbas and Patel and featured on their "best films" lists, thereby generating academic attention even decades later. Whereas, several successful studios of that time like Ranjit Film Company, Saroj Movietone, Prakash Pictures, Saraswati Cinetone, and Huns Pictures "remain undocumented".
- The first to refer to Madhubala as the "Venus of the Indian Screen".

== Columns ==
- Editorial
- Bombay Calling
- The Editor’s Mail
- Reviews
- News From Abroad
- Round The Town, which later became "Our Review"
- Studio Close-Ups
- Foreign Pictures of the Month
- Horoscope (discontinued later)
- Howlers of the Month (discontinued later)

== Popularity ==
According to author, journalist Bhawna Somaya, "It was the most popular film magazine of its time, widely appreciated for its bold stand on current issues and a scintillating style of writing. It was said that Baburao's column made and broke careers". His "acid reviews" were dreaded by producers and directors".

Dev Anand stated, "When I first came to Bombay looking for a break in the movies, somewhere within me lurked a desire to meet the man and have a look at this magician who meant the Indian movie industry to me. Baburao Patel made and unmade stars. He established or destroyed a film with just a stroke of his pen. That much power he wielded then".

== Quote ==
Baburao Patel was famous for his sharp wit, and according to Habib Tanveer he was discerning and wrote "absolutely frankly", "totally ruthlessly and funnily". He was often criticised and in a self- authored chapter stated:

"I took criticism as my main selling point. That was the best feature of filmindia. And the "Editor's Mail". Filmindia was the only paper that counted in those days. Distributors would not take delivery of the prints after reading my reviews. But it never affected the seeing public. The box-office was never affected".

== See also ==
- Cinema of India
- Mother India
