= M. P. Pandit =

Indian Spiritual author, teacher and Sanskrit scholar (1918-1993)

M. P. Pandit (born Madhav Pundalik Pandit; 14 June 1918 – 14 March 1993) was an Indian spiritual author, teacher, and Sanskrit scholar. For several decades, he served as a secretary to Mirra Alfassa (The Mother) at the Sri Aurobindo Ashram. A prolific writer, he published numerous books and articles on Integral Yoga, the philosophy of Sri Aurobindo, and the classical spiritual traditions of India, including the Vedas, Upanishads, and Tantra.

== Birth and origin ==
Madhav P. Pandit was born in Sirsi, a small town in Karnataka. His family belonged to the community of the Gowd Saraswats which had migrated from Kashmir to various parts of India. His father was a wealthy and reputed lawyer who engaged himself in manifold social activities.

== Childhood and education ==
Pandit grew up in a deeply religious Hindu family. When he was still a small child, his mother started taking him every day in the early morning to a temple where he spent his time in devotion and contemplation, which prepared and influenced his later spiritual path. All his life he was to keep some traditional customs such as Pranām.

His father wanted him to become a lawyer, following the family tradition. Therefore, he sent him to the best schools and additionally arranged for private tutoring in English, Sanskrit, mathematics and sciences. After his immatriculation Pandit continued his studies at Karnatak College in Dharwar.

== Spiritual contacts ==
Sundarrao, one of Pandit's brothers, was in close touch with Ganapati Muni, a well-known disciple of Ramana Maharshi, who was a Sanskrit scholar and poet. Even at young age Pandit came to know him as well as his student Kapali Sastry, who was to become Pandit's tutor over time. Sastry was a great scholar of the Vedas and Tantras and taught Sanskrit at a school in Madras. Later on he became a disciple of Sri Aurobindo and the Mother, joining the Sri Aurobindo Ashram where he translated some important texts of Sri Aurobindo into Sanskrit as well as into the South Indian languages Tamil and Telugu. He passed on his manifold knowledge to Pandit, giving him advice and support during his education and on his spiritual path.

== Joining the Sri Aurobindo Ashram ==
One day, while spending some time in the library of his brother, Pandit by chance discovered an article on Sri Aurobindo and felt spontaneously attracted towards the name and the photo of the freedom fighter and yogi. Subsequently, he started a regular correspondence with Kapali Sastry in Pondicherry and developed increasing interest in spiritual literature. He studied works on Ramakrishna and read the Collected Works of Swami Vivekananda, but eventually turned more and more to Sri Aurobindo and his writings.

In April 1937 for the first time he travelled to Pondicherry where Kapali Sastry arranged for his meeting with the Mother, which touched him deeply. However, following the advice of his brother, and encouraged by the Mother, he first went to Bombay in order to complete his academic studies with a bachelor's degree in economics. Thereafter, he was free to move to Pondicherry and became a member of the Sri Aurobindo Ashram in 1939, at the age of 21.

== Life in the Ashram and lecture tours ==
Having joined the Ashram, Pandit concentrated intensively on integral yoga and the work given to him. Over time, he developed his literary capacities, translating works of Kapali Sastry from Sanskrit and writing many books on philosophy, yoga, the teachings of Sri Aurobindo and the Mother or on Mantra, Tantra, Veda and the Upanishads. He always tried to use a clear, simple language in order to reach many readers. In his title Mother and I he later on reported on his frequent personal meetings with the Mother as her secretary and on the numerous topics he discussed with her. In his small books How do I begin and How do I proceed he presented some concrete hints for the practice of integral yoga.

After the Mother had left her body on 17 November 1973, he continued his activities as before, writing his correspondents that her presence and love persisted. In 1976, he started undertaking foreign travel in order to spread Sri Aurobindo's message abroad. Several times he went to the U.S. and to Europe, gave lectures and interviews or organized seminars and conferences. He regularly informed his readers about his manifold experiences in his Service Letter. However, he declined to be regarded as a "Guru" and once said in an interview in Florida that this whole ideal was old fashioned now and not any more appropriate. The knowledge that was kept secret formerly, was today freely available, he said, and everyone would be in a position to run his own life and think for himself.

After a serious illness, Pandit departed on 14 March 1993 in a clinic in Madras. When the next day his body was kept for public's view at his residence, many friends and admirers came to pay homage to him.

== Literature ==
- P. Raja (1993), M. P. Pandit. A Peep into his Past. Pondicherry, Dipti Publications
- S. Ranade (1997), Madhav Panditji. Pondicherry, Dipti Publications

== Bibliography of M.P. Pandit ==
Unless otherwise mentioned, all titles given below are from DIPTI Publications, Sri Aurobindo Ashram. Pondicherry-605 002, India. The year of publication is included under the main entry for each book. Entries in brackets are of later editions.

1950. Grace of the Great and Other Essays (1963; 1989)
1952. Mystic Approach to the Veda and the Upanishad (1966; 1974)
1957. Sri Aurobindo: Studies in the Light of His Thought
1958. Aditi and Other Deities in the Veda (1970)
1959. Japa (1961; 1971; 1977; 1986; 1991)
1959. Kundalini Yoga (1962; 1968; 1979; 1993)
1959. The Teachings of Sri Aurobindo (1964; 1978; 1990)
1960. Dhyana (1967; 1972; 1976; 1986; 1990)
1960. Highways of God
1961. Burning Brazin (1974)
1961. Where the Wings of Glory Brood (1976)
1962. Sadhana in Sri Aurobindo’s Yoga (1964)
1962. Voice of the Self
1963. Lamps of Light (1975)
1963. The Mother on India
1964. Current Problems
1965. Gems from Sri Aurobindo—First Series (1968)
1965. Kularnava Tantra (1973)
1965. The Mother of Love—Vol.I (1972; 1989)
1965. The Mother of Love—Vol.II (1972; 1990)
1966. Dictionary of Sri Aurobindo’s Yoga (1973; 1992)
1966. Gems from Sri Aurobindo—Second Series
1966. Gems from Sri Aurobindo—Third Series
1966. Glossary of Sanskrit Terms in Sri Aurobindo’s Works (1973)
1966. Light from Sri Aurobindo (1970; 1989; 1990)
1966. The Mother of Love—Vol.Ill (1972; 1990)
1966. Reminiscences and Anecdotes of Sri Aurobindo (1990)
1966. Shining Harvest
1966. Studies in the Tantra and the Veda (1967)
1967. Sri Aurobindo on the Tantra (1970; 1972)
1967. God
1967. Guide to Upanishads
1967. Key to Vedic Symbolism (1973)
1967. Light from the Gita
1967. The Mother of Love—Vol.IV
1969. The Call and the Grace (1975)
1969. Culture in Yoga
1969. Demands of Sadhana
1969. Essence of the Upanishads (1976)
1969. Gems from Sri Aurobindo—Fourth Series (1976)
1969. Gems from the Tantras—First Series
1969. Gleanings from the Upanishads (1976)
1969. Readings in Savitri—Vol.I (1988)
1970. Gems from the Tantras—Second Series (1976)
1970. Readings in Savitri—Vol.II (1989)
1970. Readings in Savitri—Vol.III
1971. Epigrams from Savitri
1971. Readings in Savitri—Vol.IV
1971. Readings in Savitri—Vol.V
1972. Sri Aurobindo: A Survey (1974)
1972. Bases of Tantra Sadhana (1977; 1991)
1973. Adoration of the Divine Mother
1973. Breath of Grace
1973. Readings in Savitri—Vol.VI
1973. Readings in Savitri—Vol.VII
1973. What Life Has Taught Me
1974. An Homage and a Pledge
1974. Meditations
1974. Project Universal Man
1974. Readings in Savitri—Vol.VIII
1975. All Life is Yoga
1975. Sri Aurobindo and the Mother: An Introduction
1975. Champaklal Speaks (1976)
1975. Dialogties and Perspectives
1975. Memorable Moments with the Mother
1975. Readings in Savitri—Vol.IX
1975. Sidelights on the Mother (1976; 1988; 1990)
1975. Something Else, Something More
1975. Under the Mother’s Banner
1976. Champaklal’s Treasures
1976. Dynamics of Yoga—Part I
1976. Singapore Chapter
1976. Yoga in Savitri
1976. The Yoga of Works
1977. Dynamics of Yoga—Part II
1977. Lights on the Tantra
1977. Readings in Savitri—Vol.X (with Index)
1977. Thoughts of a Shakta
1977. Yoga for Modern Man
1978. Dynamics of Yoga—Part III
1979. Occult Lines Behind Life (USA: Auromere)
1979. Sat-Sang—Vol.I
1980. How do I Begin? (1984; 1985; 1986; 1988; 1992)
1981. Talks on the Life Divine
1981. Yoga of Love (USA: Lotus Light Publications; 1982)
1982. Deathless Rose (1990)
1982. Heart of Sadhana (1992)
1982. How do I Proceed (1987, 1990)
1982. Introducing Savitri (1992)
1982. Sat-Sang—Vol.II
1983. Sri Aurobindo: A Biography (Delhi: Publications Division)
1983. Bases of Sadhana
1983. Book of Beginnings
1983. Call to America
1983. Commentaries on the Mother’s Ministry—Vol.I
1983. Commentaries. on. the. Mother’s. Ministry—Vol.II
1983. Integral Perfection: Talks in Sri Lanka (Sri Lanka: V. Murugesu)
1983. Spiritual Life: Philosophy and Practice
1983. Yoga of Self-Perfection
1984. Mother and I
1984. A Savitri Dictionary
1985. Commentaries. on. the. Mother’s. Ministry—Vol.III
1985. Legends in the Life Divine 1985 Life Beautiful (1987; 1989; 1992)
1985. More on Tantras (Delhi: Sterling Publishers)
1986. Book of the Divine Mother 1986 Sat-Sang—Vol.III
1986. Sat-Sang—Vol.IV
1986. Spiritual Communion
1986. Versatile Genius: Sri T.V. Kapali Sastriar
1986. The Yoga of Knowledge (USA: Lotus Light Publications)
1987. Sri Aurobindo and His Yoga (USA: Lotus Light Publications)
1987. Concept of Man in Sri Aurobindo
1987. Master and Disciple: S. Duraisamy Aiyar
1987. Pitfalls in Sadhana
1987. Sat-Sang—Vol.V
1987. Savitri: Talks in Germany
1987. Sidelights on Sri Aurobindo
1987. Traditions in Mysticism (Delhi: Sterling Publishers)
1987. Traditions in Occultism (Delhi: Sterling Publishers)
1988. Commentaries on Sri Aurobindo’s Thought— Vol.I
1988. Commentaries on Sri Aurobindo’s Thought— Vol.II
1988. Commentaries on the Mother’s Ministry— Vol.IV
1988. Guide to the Life Divine
1988. Introducing the Life Divine
1988. Mighty Impersonality (1992)
1988. Talks on Life Divine—Vol.II
1988. Tell us of the Mother
1988. Traditions in Sadhana (Delhi: Sterling Publishers)
1988. Upanishads: Gateways of Knowledge (USA: Lotus Light Publications)
1988. Vedic Symbolism
1988. Wisdom of the Upanishads
1989. Art of Living (1990)
1989. Commentaries on Sri Aurobindo’s Thought— Vol.III
1989. Education: Some Thoughts
1989. The Indian Spirit
1989. Meditations on the Divine Mother
1989. Sat-Sang—Vol.VI
1989. Vedic Deities (USA: Lotus Light Publications)
1989. Yoga of Transformation
1990. The Mother and Her Mission
1990. Thoughts on the Gita
1990. Vedic Wisdom 1990. Wisdom of the Veda (USA: Lotus Light Publications)
1991. Sat-Sang—Vol.VlI
1991. Towards Universal Man
1992. Commentaries on Sri Aurobindo’s Thought— Vol.IV
1992. An Early Chapter in the Mother’s Life
1992. Wisdom of the Gita—Vol.I
1992. Wisdom of the Gita—Vol.II
