= Kapali Sastry =

Indian Sanskrit scholar, author, and translator (1886-1953)

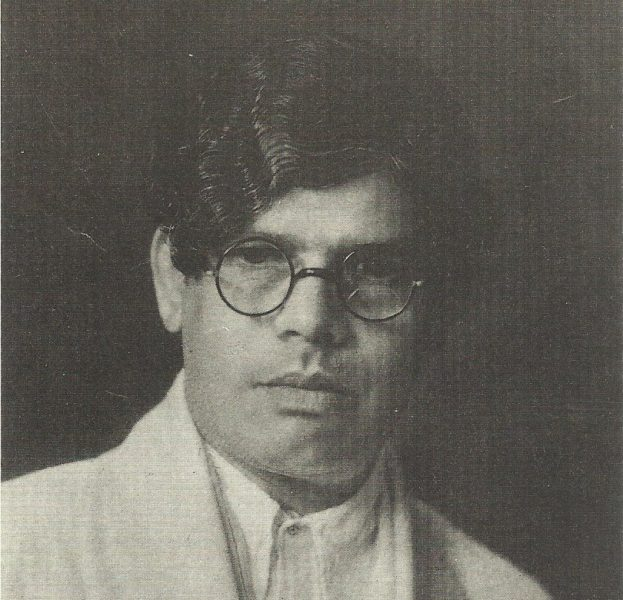
Sastry, c. 1920s

T .V. Kapali Sastry (3 September 1886 – 17 August 1953) was an eminent Sanskrit scholar, author, translator and disciple of Sri Aurobindo.

== Biography ==
Sastry was born in 1886 in a traditional Vedic family in Mylapore. He received his early education at home in Sanskrit under the guidance of his father, who was a Sanskrit scholar at the Oriental Manuscripts Library in Madras. After completing his education, he became a Sanskrit teacher at a High School in Madras.

At the age of twenty he came under the influence of Ganapati Muni, a prominent disciple of Ramana Maharshi and great scholar and poet, who passed on his vast knowledge and learning to Sastry. The latter got deeply immersed in Vedic and Tantric studies and published books and articles in English, Tamil, Telugu and Sanskrit.

After having been a disciple of Ramana Maharshi for some time, he went to Pondicherry in 1929 and became a disciple of Sri Aurobindo and the Mother (Mirra Alfassa). He studied deeply Sri Aurobindo's philosophy and writings, especially his interpretation of the Rig Veda which he explored comprehensively in several books.

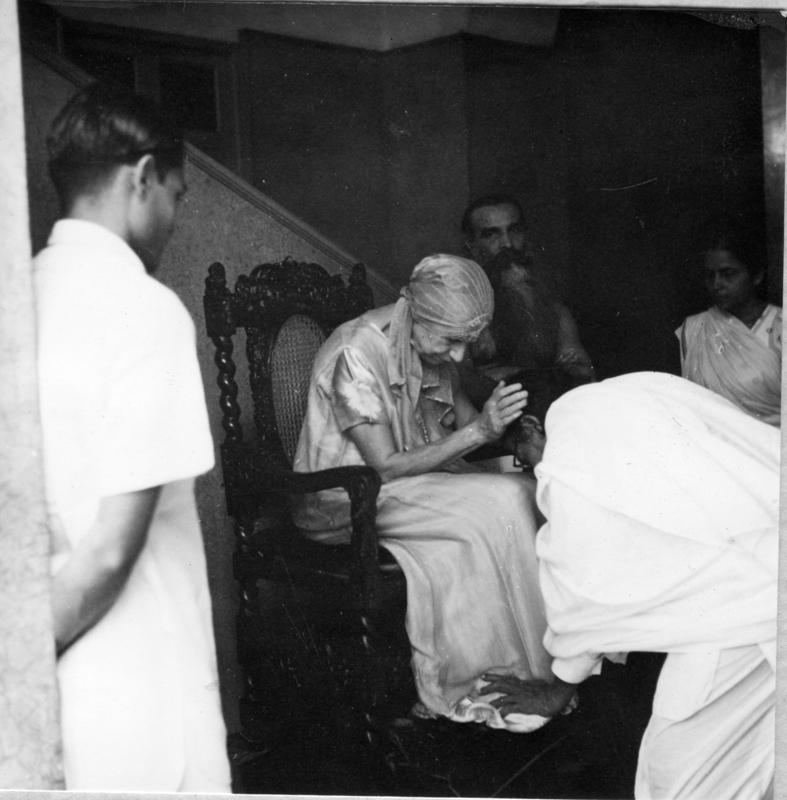
Mother-blessing-kapali-sastry-1951

Sastry died on 17 August 1953 in Pondicherry.

== Works (selection) ==
=== English ===
- Lights on the Veda
- Sidelights on the Tantra
- Sri Aurobindo: Lights on the Teachings
- The Maharshi
- Gospel of the Gita
- Rig Bhashya Bhumika

=== Sanskrit ===
- Rig Veda Bhashya (Siddhanjana)
- Matr-tattva-Prakasha
- Savitri
- Ahnikastava

=== Tamil ===
- Agni Suktangal
- Sri Aravindar
- Vennira Sudaroli

=== Telugu ===
- Matra Vakkulu

== See also ==
- M. P. Pandit

== Sources ==
- P. Raja (1993), M. P. Pandit. A Peep into his Past. Pondicherry, Dipti Publications, pp. 21–26
- S. Ranade (1997), Madhav Panditji. Pondicherry, Dipti Publications, pp. 10–11
- Kavi Yogi Shri Kapali Sastry, Inaugural Address of Dr. K. Venkatasubramanian, Vice-Chancellor, Pondicherry Central University. In: M.P. Pandit, Sat-Sang, Vol. V, Pondicherry 1987, pp. 156-160
