= Nolini Kanta Gupta =

Disciple of Sri Aurobindo (1889–1984)

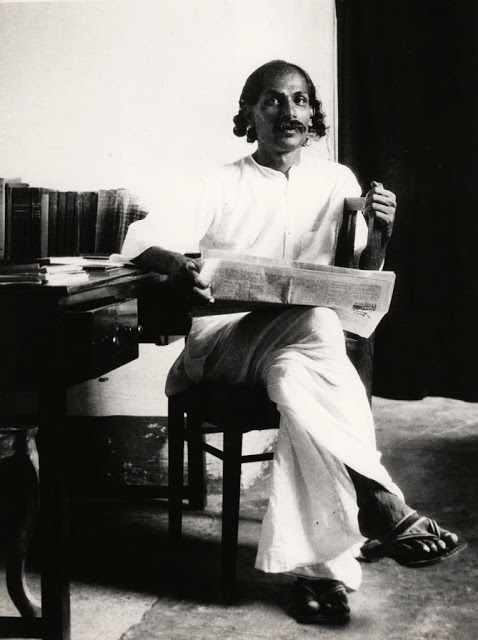
Nolini Kanta Gupta

Nolini Kanta Gupta (13 January 1889 – 7 February 1984) was a revolutionary, linguist, scholar, critic, poet, philosopher and yogi, and the most senior of Sri Aurobindo's disciples. He was born in Faridpur, East Bengal, to a cultured and prosperous Vaidya-Brahmin family. While in his teens, he came under the influence of Sri Aurobindo, then a well known revolutionary fighting for independence against the British. When in his fourth year at Presidency College, Calcutta, he left a promising academic career and rejected a lucrative government job to join a small revolutionary group under Sri Aurobindo. In May 1908 he was among those arrested for conspiracy in the Alipore bomb case. Acquitted a year later, after having spent a year in jail, he worked as a sub-editor for the Dharma and the Karmayogin, two of Sri Aurobindo's Nationalist newspapers, in 1909 and 1910.

He was taught Greek, Latin, French and Italian by Sri Aurobindo himself and was among the four disciples who were with Aurobindo in 1910 at Pondicherry. When the Sri Aurobindo Ashram was founded in 1926, he settled permanently in Pondicherry, serving the Mother and Sri Aurobindo as secretary of the ashram and later as one of its trustees. A prolific writer on a wide range of topics, he has about 60 books to his credit of which about 16 are in English and 44 in Bengali, as well as many articles and poems in English, Bengali and French.

Nolini Kanta Gupta died at the Sri Aurobindo Ashram on 7 February 1984.

== Bibliography ==
- Collected Works of Nolini Kanta Gupta (8 volumes), Sri Aurobindo Ashram, Pondicherry

1. The Coming Race
2. Essays on Poetry and Mysticism
3. The Yoga of Sri Aurobindo
4-5. Light of Lights (poems)
6-7. Sweet Mother
8. Vedic Hymns

- Reminiscences (with K. Amrita)
- Evolution and the Earthly Destiny
- About Woman (a compilation, ed. by Sacar)
- Tributes to Nolini Kanta Gupta ed. by Nirodbaran
- Nolini: Arjuna of our Age by Dr. V.M. Reddy
- Lights from Nolini Kanta Gupta
