= Arya: A Philosophical Review =

Monthly periodical written by Sri Aurobindo Ghosh from 1914 till 1921

Arya: A Philosophical Review was a 64-page monthly periodical written by Sri Aurobindo and published in India between 1914 and 1921. The majority of the material which initially appeared in the Arya was later edited and published in book-form as The Life Divine, The Synthesis of Yoga, The Secret of the Veda, The Foundations of Indian Culture and The Ideal of Human Unity as well as a number of translations of Vedic literature.

== Conception ==
The Arya was conceived as a joint venture of Sri Aurobindo and Paul Richard, a French national residing at Pondicherry, in the spring of 1914. Sri Aurobindo remarked on more than one occasion that, though he was not averse to the idea, it was Richard who initially proposed the project of publishing a journal. In a letter to Dilip Kumar Roy dated 4 September 1934, he wrote:

I knew precious little about philosophy before I did the Yoga and came to Pondicherry — I was a poet and a politician, not a philosopher! How I managed to do it? First, because Richard proposed to me to co-operate in a philosophical review — and as my theory was that a Yogi ought to be able to turn his hand to anything, I could not very well refuse....

It was clear to Sri Aurobindo that the proposed journal would represent a medium through which he could give voice to his still-emerging philosophy – both in India and abroad. In a letter to Motilal Roy from June 1914, he wrote:

[This] attempt takes the form of a new philosophical review with Richard and myself as Editors — the Arya, which is to be brought out in French and English, two separate editions, — one for France, one for India, England and America. In this Review my new theory of the Veda will appear as also translation and explanation of the Upanishads, a series of essays giving my system of Yoga and a book of Vedantic philosophy (not Shankara's but Vedic Vedanta) giving the Upanishadic foundations of my theory of the ideal life towards which humanity must move. You will see so far as my share is concerned, it will be the intellectual side of my work for the world.

== Title ==
Although it is unknown who was responsible for the choice of Arya as the title of the journal, Sri Aurobindo explained what he understood the term to represent. In the second issue (September 1914), he composed an article entitled Arya: Its Significance in which he set forth the meaning of the term as he intended it. He wrote:

Intrinsically, in its most fundamental sense, arya means an effort or an uprising and overcoming. The Aryan is he who strives and overcomes all outside him and within him that stands opposed to the human advance. Self-conquest is the first law of his nature. He overcomes earth and the body and does not consent like ordinary men to their dullness, inertia, dead routine and tamasic limitations. He overcomes life and its energies and refuses to be dominated by their hungers and cravings or enslaved by their rajasic passions. He overcomes the mind and its habits, he does not live in a shell of ignorance, inherited prejudices, customary ideas, pleasant opinions, but knows how to seek and choose, to be large and flexible in intelligence even as he is firm and strong in his will. For in everything he seeks truth, in everything right, in everything height and freedom.

== Program and organization ==
The Arya was advertised as "a review of pure philosophy" with a twofold object:

1. A systematic study of the highest problems of existence.
2. The formation of a synthesis of knowledge, harmonizing the diverse religious traditions of humanity, occidental as well as oriental.

The method of the review was described as one of "realism, at once rational and transcendental; a realism consisting in the unification of intellectual and scientific discipline with those of intuitive experimentation."

The material appearing in the Arya was organized under four main headings:

1. Synthetic studies in speculative philosophy.
2. Translations and commentaries of ancient texts.
3. Studies in comparative Religion.
4. Practical methods of inner culture and self-development.

== Early difficulties ==
Although Sri Aurobindo and Richard had planned to share the work of writing and editing the material which was to appear in the journal, Richard was ordered by the French Government to leave Pondicherry and return to France in the middle of 1915. As a result, the French edition of the journal (Revue de Grande Synthèse) was discontinued after only seven issues. Subscriptions for Arya had been sold prior to publication, and Sri Aurobindo was left with the task of completing the outstanding issues. As he remarked in 1934:

[...] And then he [Richard] had to go to the war and left me in the lurch with 64 pages a month of philosophy all to write by my lonely self...

Excepting the three contributions made by Richard to the journal (The Wherefore of the Worlds, The Eternal Wisdom and the short Sons of Heaven; see below), the bulk of the remainder was composed by Sri Aurobindo himself.

== Discontinuation ==
In 1921, after six and a half years of uninterrupted publication, Sri Aurobindo discontinued the Arya. In a private discussion in 1926, he gave his reasons for this decision:

I stopped the Arya when I found that I had to put myself out to much — so to say, externalized too much. The second reason was that I required to be drawn within myself in order to develop certain experiences, so that the energy might be used for inward work.

== Subsequent reprinting and distribution ==
Although Sri Aurobindo had discontinued its publication, there was an increasing demand for back issues of the Arya after 1921. This led him to have the Arya reprinted in seven volumes, preserving the order in which the articles had originally appeared. The contents of these seven volumes are as follows:

- Volume I (August 1914 - July 1915): The Life Divine, Chapter I - XII · The Wherefore of the Worlds, Chapter I - XI (Paul Richard) · The Secret of the Veda, Chapter I - XI · Isha Upanishad · Kena Upanishad · Synthesis of Yoga, Introduction, Chapter I - VIII · The Eternal Wisdom (Paul Richard) · Soul of a Plant (author unknown) · Question of the Month · The News of the Month · All-Will and Free-Will · Aphorisms · The Type of the Superman · Review: Hymns to the Goddess (translated from the Sanskrit by Arthur and Ellen Avalon) · The Doctrine of Taoism (author unknown) · Nammalwar (with Subramanya Bharathi).
- Volume II (August 1915 - July 1916): Our Ideal · The Life Divine, Chapter XIII - XXIV · The Secret of the Veda, Chapter XII - XX · Kena Upanishad · The Synthesis of Yoga, Chapter IX - XX · The Eternal Wisdom (Paul Richard) · The Hymns of the Atris · The Delight of Works · Evolution · A Vedic Hymn · The Inconscient · Translations: Love-Mad; Refuge (both with Subramanya Bharathi) · The Ideal of Human Unity · Reviews: South Indian Bronzes; Sanskrit Research · Rebirth · A Hymn of the Thought-Gods · Passing of War? · Conservation and Progress · Thoughts and Glimpses · On Ideals · The Conservative Mind and Eastern Progress · Yoga and Skill in Works.
- Volume III (August 1916 - July 1917): The Life Divine, Chapter XXV- XXXV · The Synthesis of Yoga, Chapter XXI - XXXII · The Psychology of Social Development · The Eternal Wisdom (Paul Richard) · Essays on the Gita · The Hymns of the Atris · The Ideal of Human Unity · The God of the Mystic Wine · Heraclitus · Review: God, the Invisible King.
- Volume IV (August 1917 - July 1918): The Life Divine, Chapter XXXVI - XLVI · Essays on the Gita · The Synthesis of Yoga, Chapter XXXIII- XLIV · The Eternal Wisdom (Paul Richard) · The Psychology of Social Development · The Hymns of the Atris · The Ideal of Human Unity · Thoughts and Glimpses · The Vedic Fire · Review: About Astrology · The Future Poetry · Translation: Sentences from Bhartrihari · The Arya's Fourth Year.
- Volume V (August 1918 - July 1919): The Life Divine, Chapter XLVII - LIII · Essays on the Gita · The Synthesis of Yoga, Chapter XLV- LVI · The Renaissance in India · The Future Poetry · The Self-Determination · Materialism · Review: The Feast of Youth · The Knowledge of Brahman · Translation: Sentences from Bhartrihari · Unseen Power · Is India Civilised? · A Rationalistic Critic on Indian Culture · Indian Culture and External Influence · Rebirth, Evolution, Heredity · Rebirth and Soul Evolution · The Significance of Rebirth · The Ascending Unity · Involution and Evolution · 1919.
- Volume VI (August 1919 - July 1920): Essays on the Gita · The Synthesis of Yoga, Chapter LVII LXVIII · A Defence of Indian Culture · The Future Poetry · The Eternal Wisdom (Paul Richard) · Karma · Karma and Freedom · Karma, Will and Consequence · Rebirth and Karma · Karma and Justice · A Vedic Hymn to the Fire · Parasara's Hymns to the Lord of the Flame · Review: Rupam.
- Volume VII (August 1920 - Jan. 1921): The Synthesis of Yoga, Chapter LXIX - LXXIII · The Eternal Wisdom (Paul Richard) · Parasara's Hymns to the Lord of the Flame · After the War · A Defence of Indian Culture · The Lines of Karma · Review: Shama'a · Sons of Heaven (Paul Richard) · Mundaka Upanishad · A Preface on National Education · The Higher Lines of Karma · Supplement.

== See also ==
- Collected Works of Sri Aurobindo
