= Sri Aurobindo =

Indian yogi (1872–1950)

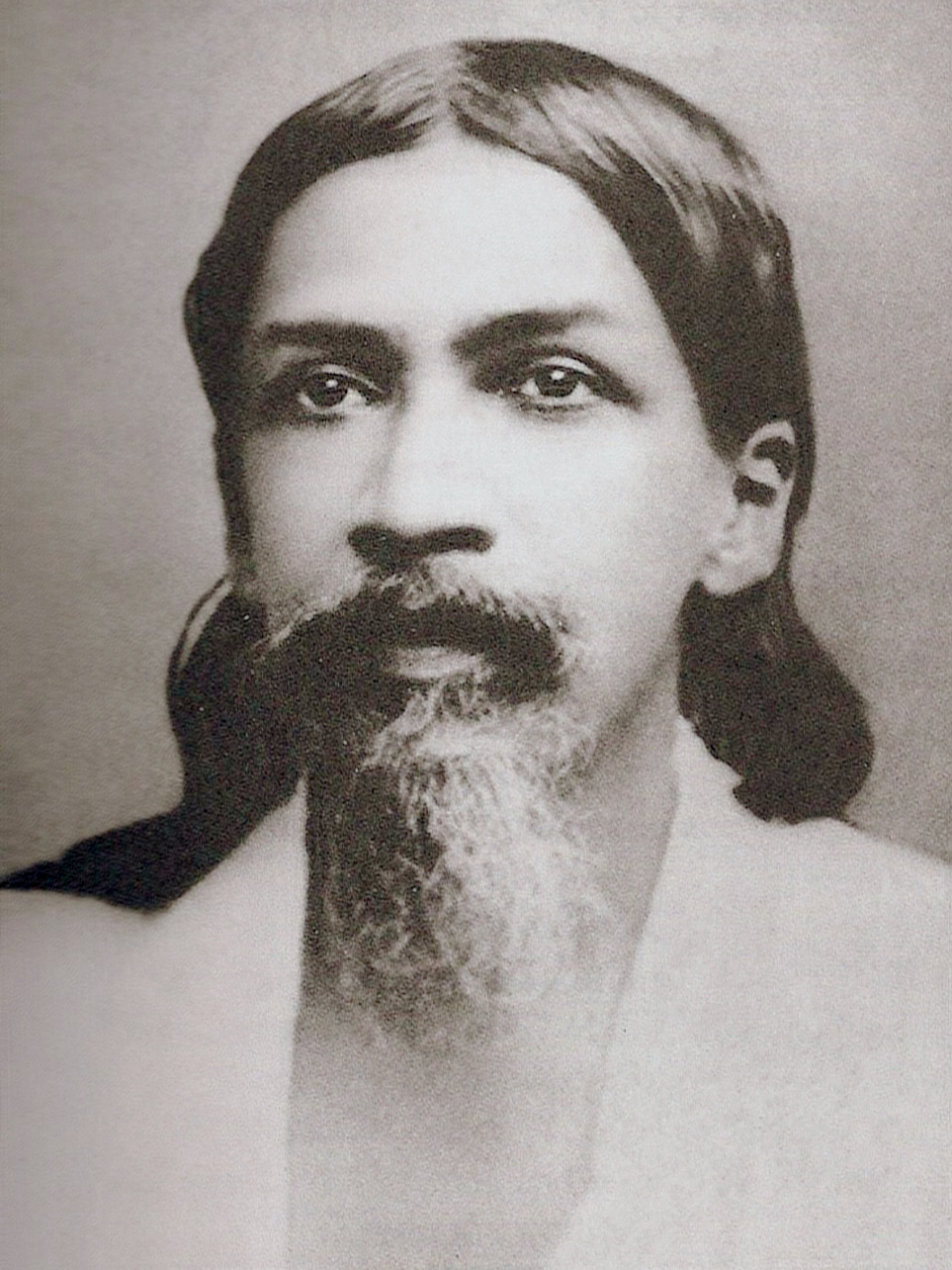
- Aurobindo, c. 1900
- Born: Aurobindo Ghosh; 15 August 1872; Calcutta, Bengal Presidency, British India
- Died: 5 December 1950 (aged 78); Pondicherry, French India
- Education: University of Cambridge
- Occupations: Yogi; Philosopher; Poet; Nationalist
- Known for: Integral yoga; Supermind; Founder of Sri Aurobindo Ashram; Spiritual Collaborator: Mirra Alfassa (The Mother); Inspiration for Auroville
- Works: The Life Divine, The Synthesis of Yoga, Savitri
- Relatives: Rajnarayan Basu (maternal-grandfather); Manmohan Ghose (brother); Barindra Kumar Ghose (brother)
- Notable disciples: Champaklal, Nolini Kanta Gupta, K. D. Sethna, Nirodbaran, Pavitra, M. P. Pandit, A.B. Purani, Dilipkumar Roy, Satprem, Indra Sen

Sri Aurobindo (born Aurobindo Ackroyd Ghosh; 15 August 1872 – 5 December 1950) was an Indian philosopher, yogi, and nationalist who is noted for his participation in the movement for India's independence from British rule; he advocated for complete autonomy through his writings and political activity. Following his imprisonment and acquittal, he withdrew to Pondicherry to devote himself to spiritual practice, eventually formulating the path of Integral Yoga. His extensive literary output includes the treatises The Life Divine and The Synthesis of Yoga and the epic poem Savitri.

Aurobindo studied for the Indian Civil Service at King's College, in Cambridge, England from 1890 until his departure in 1892. After returning to India, he took up various civil service work under the Maharaja of the princely state of Baroda. He became increasingly involved in nationalist politics in the Indian National Congress and the nascent revolutionary movement in Bengal with the Anushilan Samiti. He was arrested in the aftermath of a number of bombings linked to the revolutionary group he was associated with. He faced charges in a public trial for treason in the Alipore Conspiracy and was then released; after that, he moved to Pondicherry and developed a spiritual practice he called Integral Yoga. He wrote The Life Divine, which deals with the philosophical aspect of Integral Yoga and Synthesis of Yoga, which deals with the principles and methods of Integral Yoga. In 1926, he and Mirra Alfassa founded Sri Aurobindo Ashram.

Sri Aurobindo created a major literary corpus in English. His work synthesizes the histories of Eastern and Western philosophy, religion, literature, and psychology into a complex vision of the transition of humanity to divinity. His principal philosophical writings are The Life Divine and The Synthesis of Yoga, while his principal poetic work is Savitri: a Legend and a Symbol. He wrote translations and commentaries on the Vedas, Upanishads, and the Gita, among others; plays; literary, social, political, and historical criticism; devotional works; and an extensive collection of correspondence. Several volumes of his conversations have also been recorded.

== Biography ==
=== Early Life and Family Background ===
Aurobindo Ghosh was born in Calcutta (now Kolkata), Bengal Presidency, India on 15 August 1872 in a Bengali Kayastha family that was associated with the town of Konnagar in the Hooghly district of present-day West Bengal. His father, Krishna Dhun Ghosh, was an assistant surgeon in Rangpur and later a civil surgeon in Khulna. A former member of the Brahmo Samaj, he became fascinated with the new theory of evolution while studying medicine in Edinburgh. (Note: Aurobindo described his father as a "tremendous atheist" but Thakur calls him an agnostic and Heehs believes that he followed his own coda.) His mother, Swarnalata Devi, was the daughter of Rajnarayan Bose, a leading figure in the Brahmo Samaj. Swarnalata Devi was sent to Calcutta for Aurobindo's birth for its healthier environment. Aurobindo had two elder siblings, Benoybhusan and Manmohan, a younger sister, Sarojini, and a younger brother, Barindra Kumar (also referred to as Barin).

Aurobindo spoke English but used Hindustani to communicate with servants. Although his family was Bengali, his father believed British culture to be superior. He and his two elder siblings were sent to the English-speaking Loreto House boarding school in Darjeeling, in part to improve their language skills and in part to distance them from their mother, who had developed a mental illness soon after the birth of her first child. Darjeeling was a centre of Anglo-Indians in India, and the school was run by Irish nuns, through which the boys would have been exposed to Christian religious teachings and symbolism.

=== Education in England (1879–1893) ===
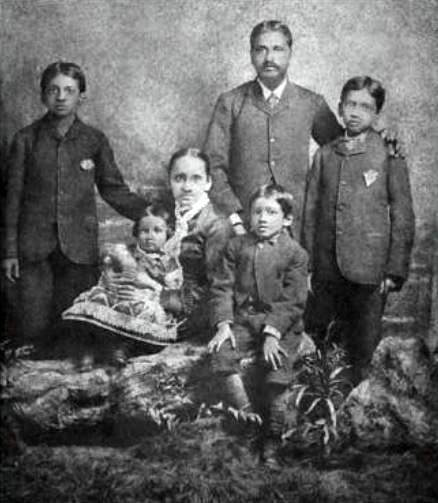
Aurobindo (seated centre next to his mother) and his family. In England, ca. 1879

Krishna Dhun Ghose's intention was his sons to enter the Indian Civil Service (ICS), an elite organisation comprising around 1000 people. To do so, they needed to study in England, so the entire family moved there in 1879. (Note: Krishna Dhun Ghose returned to India soon after, leaving his wife in the care of a physician in London. Barindra was born in England in January 1880.) The three brothers were sent in the care of the Reverend W. H. Drewett in Manchester. Drewett was a minister of the Congregational Church whom Krishna Dhun Ghose knew through his British friends at Rangpur. (Note: While in Manchester, the Ghose brothers lived first at 84 Shakespeare Street and then, by the time of the 1881 census, at 29 York Place, Chorlton-on-Medlock. The census recorded Aurobindo as Aravinda Ghose, as the University of Cambridge also listed him that way.)

The boys began learning Latin with Drewett and his wife. This was a prerequisite for admission to good English schools, and after two years, in 1881, the two elder siblings were enrolled at Manchester Grammar School. Aurobindo was considered too young to enrol, so he continued his studies with the Drewetts, learning history, Latin, French, geography, and arithmetic. Although the Drewetts were told not to teach religion, the boys inevitably were exposed to Christian teachings and events, which generally bored Aurobindo and sometimes repulsed him. There was little contact with his father, who wrote only a few letters to his sons while they were in England, but what communication there was indicated that he was becoming less endeared to the British in India than he had been, on one occasion describing the British colonial government as "heartless".

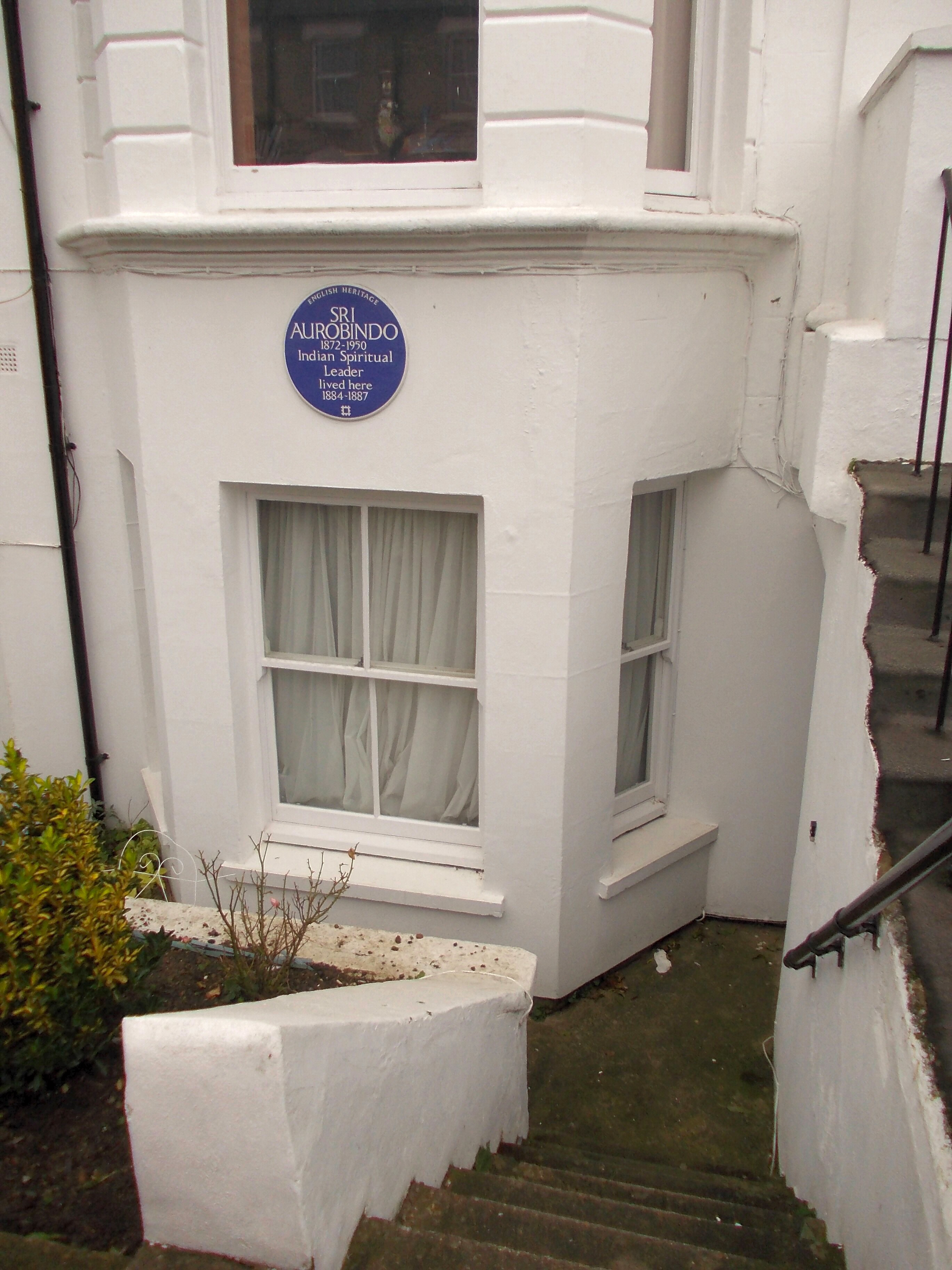
Basement of 49 St Stephen's Avenue, London W12 with Sri Aurobindo Blue Plaque

Drewett emigrated to Australia in 1884, causing the boys to be uprooted as they went to live with Drewett's mother in London. In September of that year, Aurobindo and Manmohan joined St Paul's School there. (Note: Benoybhusan's education ended in Manchester.) He learned Greek and spent the last three years reading literature and English poetry, while he also acquired some familiarity with the German and Italian languages; Peter Heehs summarised his linguistic abilities by stating that at "the turn of the century he knew at least twelve languages: English, French, and Bengali to speak, read, and write; Latin, Greek, and Sanskrit to read and write; Gujarati, Marathi, and Hindi to speak and read; and Italian, German, and Spanish to read." Being exposed to the evangelical strictures of Drewett's mother developed in him a distaste for religion, and he considered himself at one point to be an atheist but later determined that he was agnostic. A blue plaque unveiled in 2007 commemorates Aurobindo's residence at 49 St Stephen's Avenue in Shepherd's Bush, London, from 1884 to 1887. The three brothers began living in spartan circumstances at the Liberal Club in South Kensington during 1887, their father having experienced some financial difficulties. The club's secretary was James Cotton, brother of their father's friend in the Bengal ICS, Henry John Stedman Cotton.

By 1889, Manmohan had determined to pursue a literary career, and Benoybhusan had proved himself unequal to the standards necessary for ICS entrance. This meant that only Aurobindo might fulfill his father's aspirations, but to do so when his father lacked money required that he study hard for a scholarship. To become an ICS official, students were required to pass the competitive examination and study at an English university for two years under probation. Aurobindo secured a scholarship at King's College, Cambridge, under the recommendation of Oscar Browning. He passed the written ICS examination after a few months and ranked 11th out of 250 competitors. He spent the next two years at King's College. Aurobindo had no interest in the ICS and came to the horse-riding practical exam purposefully to get himself disqualified for the service.In 1891, Sri Aurobindo also felt that a period of great upheaval for his motherland was coming in which he was destined to play an important role. He began to learn Bengali and joined a secret society, romantically named 'Lotus and Dagger', where the members took an oath to work for India's freedom.

The Maharaja of Baroda, Sayajirao Gaekwad III, was travelling in England. Cotton secured Aurobindo a place in Baroda State Service and arranged for him to meet the prince. He left England for India, arriving there in February 1893. In India, Krishna Dhun Ghose, who was waiting to receive his son, was misinformed by his agents from Bombay (now Mumbai) that the ship on which Aurobindo had been travelling had sunk off the coast of Portugal. His father died upon hearing this news.

=== Career in Baroda and Political Involvement (1893–1910) ===
In Baroda, Aurobindo joined the state service in 1893, working first in the Survey and Settlements department, later moving to the Department of Revenue and then to the Secretariat, and much miscellaneous work like teaching grammar and assisting in writing speeches for the Maharaja of Gaekwad until 1897. In 1897, during his work in Baroda, he started working as a part-time French teacher at Baroda College (now Maharaja Sayajirao University of Baroda). He was later promoted to the post of vice-principal. At Baroda, Aurobindo self-studied Sanskrit and Bengali.

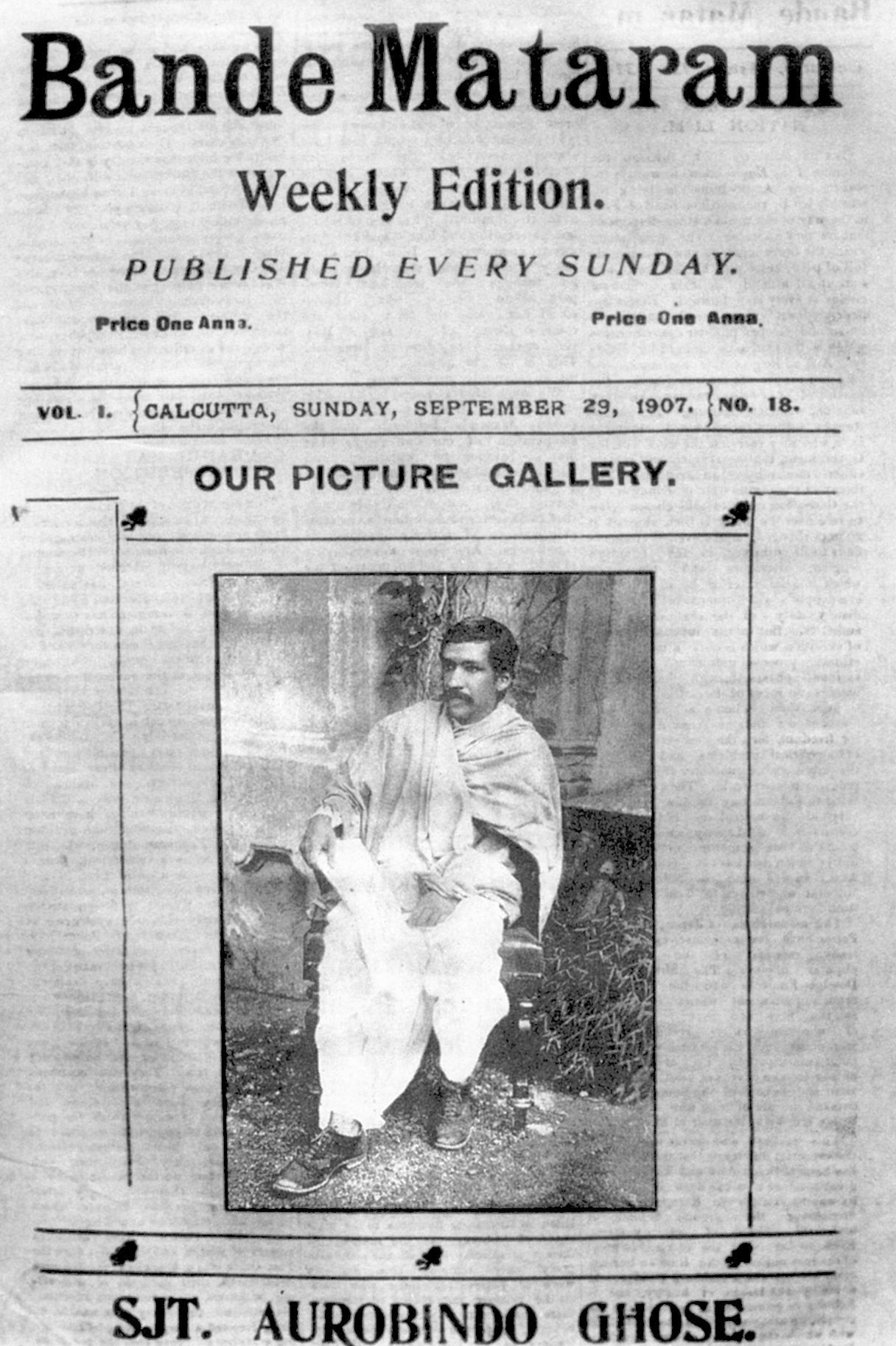
Copy of Bande Mataram, September 1907

When he lived at Baroda, he contributed to many articles for Indu Prakash and spoke as a chairman of the Baroda college board. He took an active interest in the politics of the Indian independence movement against British colonial rule, working behind the scenes as his position in the Baroda state administration barred him from an overt political activity. While traveling to these states, he linked up with resistance groups in Bengal and Madhya Pradesh. Aurobindo established contact with Lokmanya Tilak and Sister Nivedita.

Aurobindo often travelled between Baroda and Bengal, initially in a bid to re-establish links with his parents' families and other Bengali relatives, including his sister Sarojini and brother Barin, and later increased to establish resistance groups across the Presidency. He formally moved to Calcutta in 1906 after the announcement of the Partition of Bengal and stayed at Raja Subodh Mullick's house as a guest till 1907. In 1901, on a visit to Calcutta, he married 14-year-old Mrinalini, the daughter of Bhupal Chandra Bose, a senior official in government service. Aurobindo was 28 at that time. Mrinalini died seventeen years later in December 1918 during the influenza pandemic.

In 1906, Aurobindo was appointed the first principal of the National College in Calcutta and started to impart national education to Indian youth. He resigned from this position in August 1907, due to his increased political activity. The National College continues to the present as Jadavpur University, Kolkata.

Aurobindo was influenced by studies on rebellion and revolutions against England in medieval France and the revolts in America and Italy. In his public activities, he favored non-cooperation and nonviolent resistance; in private, he took up secret revolutionary activity to prepare for open revolt in case the passive uprising failed.

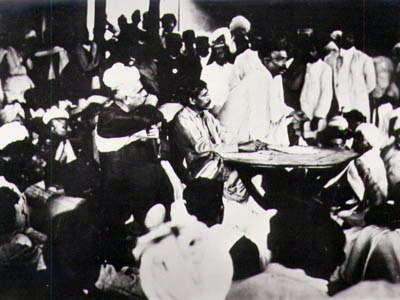
Sri Aurobindo seated at the table, with Tilak speaking: Surat session of Congress, 1907

In Bengal, with Barin's help, he established contacts and inspired revolutionaries such as Bagha Jatin or Jatin Mukherjee and Surendranath Tagore. He helped establish a series of youth clubs, including the Anushilan Samiti of Calcutta in 1902.

Aurobindo attended the 1906 Congress meeting headed by Dadabhai Naoroji and participated as a councilor in forming the fourfold objectives of "Swaraj, Swadesh, Boycott, and national education". In 1907, at the Surat session of Congress, where moderates and extremists had a major showdown, he led along with extremists and along with Bal Gangadhar Tilak. The Congress split after this session. In 1907–1908, Aurobindo traveled extensively to Pune, Bombay, and Baroda to firm up support for the nationalist cause, giving speeches and meeting with groups. He was arrested again in May 1908 in connection with the Alipore Bomb Case. He was acquitted in the ensuing trial following the murder of chief prosecution witness Naren Goswami within jail premises, which subsequently led to the case against him collapsing. Aurobindo was subsequently released after a year of isolated incarceration.

Once out of prison, he started two new publications, Karmayogin in English and Dharma in Bengali. He also delivered the Uttarpara Speech, hinting at the transformation of his focus to spiritual matters. Repression from the British colonial government against him continued because of his writings in his new journals, and in April 1910, Aurobindo moved to Pondicherry, where the British colonial secret police monitored his activities.

=== Revolutionary Activities and the Alipore Bomb Case ===
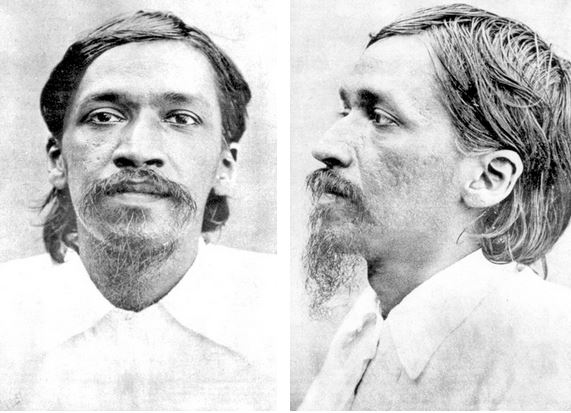
Photographs of Aurobindo as a prisoner in Alipore Jail, 1908.

In July 1905, then Viceroy of India, Lord Curzon, partitioned Bengal. This sparked an outburst of public anger against the British, leading to civil unrest and a nationalist campaign by groups of revolutionaries that included Aurobindo. In 1908, Khudiram Bose and Prafulla Chaki attempted to kill Magistrate Kingsford, a judge known for handing down particularly severe sentences against nationalists. However, the bomb thrown at his horse carriage missed its target and instead landed in another carriage and killed two British women, the wife and daughter of barrister Pringle Kennedy. Aurobindo was also arrested on charges of planning and overseeing the attack and imprisoned in solitary confinement in Alipore Jail. The trial of the Alipore Bomb Case lasted for a year, but eventually, he was acquitted on 6 May 1909. His defense counsel was Chittaranjan Das.

During this period in the Jail, his view of life was radically changed due to spiritual experiences and realisations. Consequently, his aim went far beyond the service and liberation of the country.

Aurobindo said he was visited by Vivekananda in the Alipore Jail: "It is a fact that I was hearing constantly the voice of Vivekananda speaking to me for a fortnight in the jail in my solitary meditation and felt his presence."

In his autobiographical notes, Aurobindo said he felt a vast calm when returning to India. He could not explain this and continued to have various such experiences occasionally. He knew nothing of yoga at that time and started his practice of it without a teacher, except for some rules that he learned from Mr. Devadhar, a friend who was a disciple of Swami Brahmananda of Ganga Math, Chandod. In 1907, Barin introduced Aurobindo to Vishnu Bhaskar Lele, a Maharashtrian yogi. Aurobindo was influenced by guidance from the yogi, who instructed Aurobindo to depend on an inner guide, and any external guru or guidance would not be required.

In 1910, Aurobindo withdrew himself from all political activities and went into hiding at Chandannagar in the house of Motilal Roy while the British colonial government was attempting to prosecute him for sedition based on a signed article titled "To My Countrymen", published in Karmayogin. As Aurobindo disappeared from view, the warrant was held back, and the prosecution postponed. Aurobindo maneuvered the police into open action, and a warrant was issued on 4 April 1910, but the warrant could not be executed because, on that date, he had reached Pondicherry, then a French colony. The warrant against Aurobindo was withdrawn.

=== Spiritual Retreat, Literary Output, and Legacy, Pondicherry (1910–1950) ===
In Pondicherry, Sri Aurobindo dedicated himself to his spiritual and philosophical pursuits. In 1914, after four years of secluded yoga, he started a monthly philosophical magazine called Arya. This ceased publication in 1921. Many years later, he revised some of these works before they were published in book form. Some of the book series derived from this publication were The Life Divine, The Synthesis of Yoga, Essays on The Gita, The Secret of The Veda, Hymns to the Mystic Fire, The Upanishads, The Renaissance in India, War and Self-determination, The Human Cycle, The Ideal of Human Unity and The Future Poetry were published in this magazine.

At the beginning of his stay at Pondicherry, there were few followers, but with time, their numbers grew, resulting in the formation of the Sri Aurobindo Ashram in 1926. From 1926 he started to sign himself as Sri Aurobindo, Sri being commonly used as an honorific.

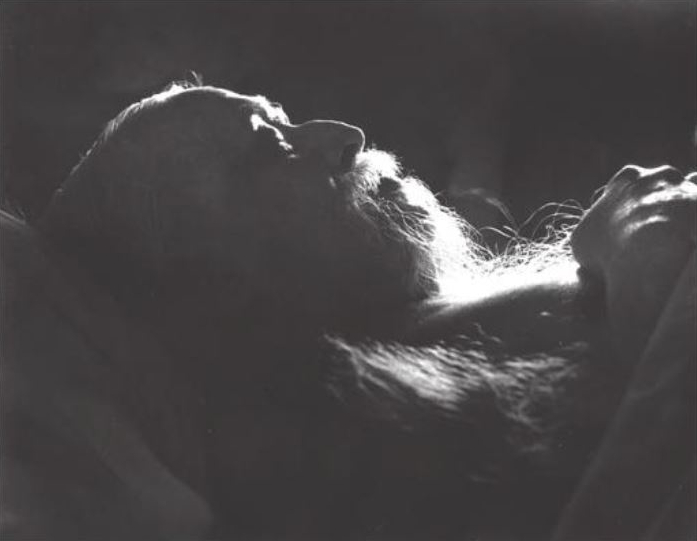
Sri Aurobindo on his deathbed 5 December 1950

For some time afterwards, his main literary output was his voluminous correspondence with his disciples. His letters, most of which were written in the 1930s, numbered several thousand. Many were brief comments made in the margins of his disciples' notebooks in answer to their questions and reports of their spiritual practice—others extended to several pages of carefully composed explanations of practical aspects of his teachings. These were later collected and published in book form in three volumes of Letters on Yoga. In the late 1930s, he resumed work on a poem he had started earlier—he continued to expand and revise this poem for the rest of his life. It became perhaps his most outstanding literary achievement, Savitri, an epic spiritual poem in blank verse of approximately 24,000 lines.

On 15 August 1947, Sri Aurobindo strongly opposed the partition of India, stating that he hoped "the Nation will not accept the settled fact as forever settled, or as anything more than a temporary expedient."

Sri Aurobindo was nominated for the Nobel Prize in Literature in 1943 and for the Nobel Peace Prize in 1950.

Sri Aurobindo died on 5 December 1950 of uremia. Around 60,000 people attended to see his body resting peacefully. Indian Prime Minister Jawaharlal Nehru, and the President Rajendra Prasad praised him for his contribution to Yogic philosophy and the independence movement. National and international newspapers commemorated his death.

=== Mirra Alfassa Mother and the Development of the Ashram ===
Sri Aurobindo's close spiritual collaborator, Mirra Alfassa (born Alfassa), came to be known as The Mother. She was a French national, born in Paris on 21 February 1878. In her 20s, she studied occultism with Max Theon. Along with her husband, Paul Richard, she went to Pondicherry on 29 March 1914, and finally settled there in 1920. Sri Aurobindo considered her his spiritual equal and collaborator. After 24 November 1926, when Sri Aurobindo retired into seclusion, he left it to her to plan, build, and run the ashram, the community of disciples gathered around them. Sometime later, when families with children joined the ashram, she established and supervised the Sri Aurobindo International Centre of Education with its experiments in education. When he died in 1950, she continued their spiritual work, directed the ashram, and guided their disciples.

== Philosophy ==
Sri Aurobindo's model of Being and Evolution
Levels of Being					Development
Overall	Outer Being		Inner Being	Psychic Being	Development
Supermind	Supermind				Gnostic Man
Supermind	Supermind				Supra-mentalisation
Mind		Overmind			Psychisation and Spiritualisation
Mind		Intuition			Psychisation and Spiritualisation
Mind		Illuminated Mind			Psychisation and Spiritualisation
Mind		Higher Mind			Psychisation and Spiritualisation
Mind	Subconscient mind	Mind proper	Subliminal (inner) mind		Evolution
Vital	Subconscient; Vital	Vital	Subliminal (inner) Vital		Evolution
Physical	Subconscient; Physical	Physical	Subl. (inner); Physical		Evolution
Inconscient	Inconscient				

=== Introduction ===
Sri Aurobindo's concept of the Integral Yoga system is described in his books The Synthesis of Yoga and The Life Divine. The Life Divine is a compilation of essays published serially in Arya.

Sri Aurobindo argues that divine Brahman manifests as empirical reality through līlā, or divine play. Instead of positing that the world we experience is an illusion (māyā), Aurobindo argues that the world can evolve and become a new world with new species, far above the human species, just as the human species evolved after the animal species. As such, he argued that the end goal of spiritual practice could not merely be liberation from the world into samadhi, but also the descent of the Divine into the world to transform it into a divine existence. Thus, Integral Yoga aimed to achieve this. Regarding the involution of consciousness in matter, he wrote that "this descent, this sacrifice of the purusha, the divine soul submitting itself to force and matter so that it may inform and illuminate them is the seed of redemption of this world of Inconscience and Ignorance."

Sri Aurobindo believed that evolutionary theories describe the emergence of life from matter but not why it happens. He contended that life is already involved in matter, as all existence is a manifestation of Brahman. Furthermore, he felt that "nature" has developed life from inanimate matter and consciousness from biological life, and that this evolutionary process serves a specific purpose: to manifest the Supermind, an overarching divine intelligence. He noted that this evolutionary labour, a "cosmic necessity", is arduous and often "difficult to justify by immediate tangible results", leading some to seek an escape from it rather than fulfilling its aim.

=== Supermind ===
At the centre of Sri Aurobindo's metaphysical system is the Supermind, an intermediary power between the unmanifested Brahman and the manifest world. Sri Aurobindo argues that the Supermind is not completely alien to humankind: "Mind" is identical with Supermind in essence and conceals it within itself as a potentiality. He explains that while he first used the word supermind himself, the concept of a "Truth-Consciousness" appeared in the Vedas, wherein the Vedic Gods embody its powers. In Letters on Yoga, he proclaims: "By the Supermind is meant the full Truth-consciousness of the Divine Nature in which there can be no place for the principle of division and ignorance; it is always a full light and knowledge superior to all mental substance or mental movement." Supermind is a bridge between saccidānanda and the lower manifestation; it is only through the supramental power that mind, life, and body can be integrally transformed, as the realisation of saccidānanda supports but does not transform the lower nature. The descent of the Supermind is intended to create a supramental race upon earth.

=== Affinity with Western philosophy ===
In his writings, talks, and letters, Sri Aurobindo discussed several European philosophers, commenting on their ideas and their connection to his own thoughts. He wrote a long essay on the Greek philosopher Heraclitus, for example, and mentioned Plato, Plotinus, Nietzsche, and Henri Bergson as thinkers whose "intuitive approach" he found interesting. On the other hand, he felt little attraction to the philosophies of Kant or Hegel. Several studies have shown a remarkable closeness to the evolutionary thought of Teilhard de Chardin, whom he did not know, whereas the latter learned of Sri Aurobindo late in life. After reading some chapters of The Life Divine, he is reported to have said that Sri Aurobindo's vision of evolution was basically the same as his own, though stated for Asian readers.

Several scholars have discovered significant similarities in the thought of Sri Aurobindo and Hegel. In the early 1980s, Steve Odin discussed the subject comprehensively in a comparative study. Odin wrote that Sri Aurobindo "appropriated Hegel's notion of an Absolute Spirit and employed it to radically restructure the architectonic framework of the ancient Hindu Vedanta system in contemporary terms." In his analysis, Odin concludes that "both philosophers similarly envision world creation as the progressive self-manifestation and evolutionary ascent of a universal consciousness in its journey toward self-realization." He pointed out that in contrast to the deterministic and continuous dialectical unfolding of Absolute Reason by the mechanism of thesis–antithesis–synthesis or affirmation–negation–integration, "Sri Aurobindo argues for a creative, emergent mode of evolution." In his résumé, Odin states that Sri Aurobindo had overcome the ahistorical worldview of traditional Hinduism and presented a concept that allowed for a genuine advance and novelty.

=== Importance of the Upanishads ===
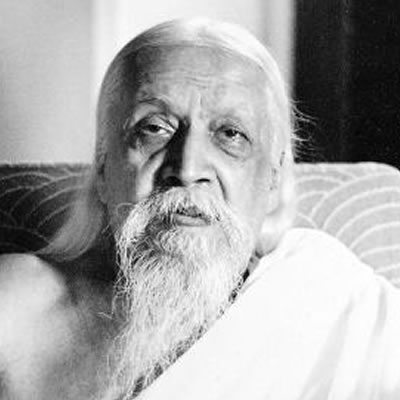
Sri Aurobindo

Although Sri Aurobindo was familiar with important lines of thought in Western philosophy, he did not acknowledge their influence on his own writings. He wrote that his philosophy "was formed first by the study of the Upanishads and the Gita … They were the basis of my first practice of Yoga." With the help of his readings he tried to move on to actual experience, "and it was on this experience that later on I founded my philosophy, not on ideas themselves."

He assumed that the seers of the Upanishads took essentially the same approach and provided details of his vision of the past in a lengthy passage in The Renaissance of India. "The Upanishads have been the acknowledged source of numerous profound philosophies and religions," he writes. Even Buddhism, with all its developments, was merely a "restatement" from a new perspective and in fresh terms. Moreover, the ideas of the Upanishads "can be rediscovered in much of the thought of Pythagoras and Plato and form the profound part of Neo-platonism and Gnosticism ..." Ultimately, most of German metaphysics "is little more in substance than an intellectual development of great realities more spiritually seen in this ancient teaching." When a disciple once asked him if Plato derived some of his ideas from Indian writings, he replied that although some of Indian philosophy influenced him "by means of Pythagoras and others," he believed that Plato mainly relied on intuition for his ideas.

Sri Aurobindo's indebtedness to the Indian tradition also becomes obvious through his placing a large number of quotations from the Rig Veda, the Upanishads, and the Gita at the beginning of the chapters in The Life Divine, showing the connection of his own thought to the Vedas and Vedanta.

The Isha Upanishad is considered to be one of the most important and accessible writings of Sri Aurobindo. Before he published his final translation and analysis, he wrote ten incomplete commentaries. In a key passage, he points out that the Brahman or Absolute is both "the stable" and "the moving". "We must see it in eternal and immutable Spirit and in all the changing manifestations of the universe and relativity." Sri Aurobindo's biographer, K. R. Srinivasa Iyengar, noted that R. S. Mugali suggested Sri Aurobindo may have found the initial idea in this Upanishad that eventually developed into The Life Divine.

=== Synthesis and integration ===
Sisir Kumar Maitra, who was a leading exponent of Sri Aurobindo's philosophy, referred to the issue of external influences on Sri Aurobindo by noting that he did not mention names. Rather, he argued, "as one reads his books one cannot fail to notice how thorough is his grasp of the great Western philosophers of the present age..." Although he was Indian, one should not "underrate the influence of Western thought upon him. This influence is there, very clearly visible, but Sri Aurobindo... has not allowed himself to be dominated by it. He has made full use of Western thought, but he has made use of it for the purpose of building up his own system..." Thus, Maitra, like Steve Odin, saw Sri Aurobindo not only in the tradition and context of India, but also via Western philosophy and assumed he may have adopted some elements from the latter for his synthesis.

R. Puligandla supports this viewpoint in his book Fundamentals of Indian Philosophy, describing Sri Aurobindo's philosophy as "an original synthesis of the Indian and Western traditions":

He integrates in a unique fashion the great social, political and scientific achievements of the modern West with the ancient and profound spiritual insights of Hinduism. The vision that powers the life divine of Aurobindo is none other than the Upanishadic vision of the unity of all existence.

Puligandla also discussed Sri Aurobindo's critical position vis-à-vis Adi Shankara and his thesis that the latter's Vedanta was a world-negating philosophy, as it teaches that the world is unreal and illusory. From Puligandla's standpoint, this is a misrepresentation of Shankara's position, which may have been precipitated by Sri Aurobindo's endeavour to synthesise Hindu and Western modes of thought, identifying Shankara's Mayavada with the subjective idealism of George Berkeley.

However, U. C. Dubey supports Sri Aurobindo's critique of Shankara in his paper entitled "Integralism: The Distinctive Feature of Sri Aurobindo's Philosophy". He notes that Sri Aurobindo's system presents an integral view of reality, where no opposition exists between the Absolute and its creative force, as they are one. Furthermore, he refers to Sri Aurobindo's conception of the supermind as the mediatory principle between the Absolute and the finite world, and quotes Maitra as saying that this conception "is the pivot round which the whole of Sri Aurobindo's philosophy moves."

Dubey analyzes the Shankarite approach and argues that it follows an inadequate logic that fails to address the challenge of the Absolute, which finite reason cannot know. With the help of finite reason, he says, "we are bound to determine the nature of reality as one or many, being or becoming. But Sri Aurobindo's Integral Advaitism reconciles all apparently different aspects of Existence in an all-embracing unity of the Absolute." Next, Dubey explains that for Sri Aurobindo there is a higher reason, the "logic of the infinite" in which his integralism is rooted.

== Legacy ==
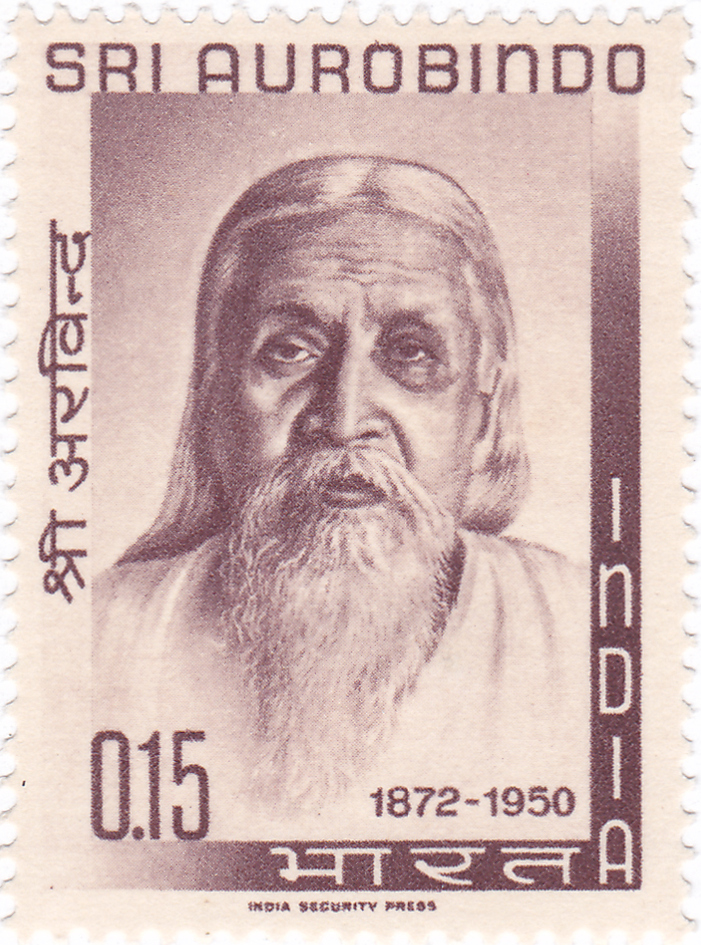
Sri Aurobindo on a 1964 Indian stamp

=== Influence ===
His influence has been wide-ranging. In India, S. K. Maitra, Anilbaran Roy and D. P. Chattopadhyaya commented on Sri Aurobindo's work. Writers on esotericism and traditional wisdom, such as Mircea Eliade, Paul Brunton saw him as an authentic representative of the Indian spiritual tradition.

Haridas Chaudhuri and Frederic Spiegelberg were among those who were inspired by Aurobindo, who worked on the newly formed American Academy of Asian Studies in San Francisco. Soon after, Chaudhuri and his wife Bina established the Cultural Integration Fellowship, from which later emerged the California Institute of Integral Studies.

Sri Aurobindo influenced Subhash Chandra Bose to take an initiative of dedicating to Indian National Movement full-time. Bose writes, "The illustrious example of Arabindo Ghosh looms large before my vision. I feel that I am ready to make the sacrifice which that example demands of me."

Karlheinz Stockhausen was heavily inspired by Satprem's writings about Sri Aurobindo during a week in May 1968, a time at which the composer was undergoing a personal crisis and had found Sri Aurobindo's philosophies were relevant to his feelings.

Jean Gebser acknowledged Sri Aurobindo's influence on his work and referred to him several times in his writings. Thus, in The Invisible Origin he quotes a long passage from The Synthesis of Yoga. Gebser believes that he was "in some way brought into the extremely powerful spiritual field of force radiating through Sri Aurobindo." In his title Asia Smiles Differently he reports about his visit to the Sri Aurobindo Ashram and meeting with the Mother whom he calls an "exceptionally gifted person."

After meeting Sri Aurobindo in Pondicherry in 1915, the Danish author and artist Johannes Hohlenberg published one of the first Yoga titles in Europe and later on wrote two essays on Sri Aurobindo. He also published extracts from The Life Divine in Danish translation.

The Chilean Nobel Prize winner Gabriela Mistral called Sri Aurobindo "a unique synthesis of a scholar, a theologian and one who is enlightened." "The gift of Civil Leadership, the gift of Spiritual Guidance, the gift of Beautiful Expression: this is the trinity, the three lances of light with which Sri Aurobindo has reached the great number of Indians..."

William Irwin Thompson travelled to Auroville in 1972, where he met "The Mother". Thompson has called Sri Aurobindo's teaching on spirituality a "radical anarchism" and a "post-religious approach" and regards their work as having "... reached back into the Goddess culture of prehistory, and, in Marshall McLuhan's terms, 'culturally retrieved' the archetypes of the shaman and la sage femme... " Thompson also writes that he experienced Shakti, or psychic power coming from The Mother on the night of her death in 1973.

Sri Aurobindo's ideas about the further evolution of human capabilities influenced the thinking of Michael Murphy – and indirectly, the human potential movement, through Murphy's writings.

The American philosopher Ken Wilber has called Sri Aurobindo "India's greatest modern philosopher sage" and has integrated some of his ideas into his philosophical vision. Wilber's interpretation of Aurobindo has been criticised by Rod Hemsell. New Age writer Andrew Harvey also looks to Sri Aurobindo as a major inspiration.

=== Followers ===
The following authors, disciples and organisations trace their intellectual heritage back to, or have in some measure been influenced by, Sri Aurobindo and The Mother.

- Nolini Kanta Gupta (1889–1983) was one of Sri Aurobindo's senior disciples, and wrote extensively on philosophy, mysticism, and spiritual evolution based on the teaching of Sri Aurobindo and "The Mother".
- Nirodbaran (1903–2006). A doctor who obtained his medical degree from Edinburgh, his long and voluminous correspondence with Sri Aurobindo elaborates on many aspects of Integral Yoga, and his fastidious record of conversations brings out Sri Aurobindo's thought on numerous subjects.
- M. P. Pandit (1918–1993). Secretary to "The Mother" and the ashram, his copious writings and lectures cover Yoga, the Vedas, Tantra, Sri Aurobindo's epic "Savitri" and others.
- Sri Chinmoy (1931–2007) joined the ashram in 1944. Later, he wrote the play about Sri Aurobindo's life – Sri Aurobindo: Descent of the Blue – and a book, Infinite: Sri Aurobindo. An author, composer, artist and athlete, he was perhaps best known for holding public events on the theme of inner peace and world harmony (such as concerts, meditations, and races).
- Pavitra (1894–1969) was one of their early disciples. Born as Philippe Barbier Saint-Hilaire in Paris. Pavitra left some very interesting memoirs of his conversations with them in 1925 and 1926, which were published as Conversations avec Pavitra.
- Dilipkumar Roy (1897–1980) was an Indian Bengali musician, musicologist, novelist, poet and essayist.
- T.V. Kapali Sastry (1886–1953) was an eminent author and Sanskrit scholar. He joined the Sri Aurobindo Ashram in 1929 and wrote books and articles in four languages, exploring especially Sri Aurobindo's Vedic interpretations.
- Satprem (1923–2007) was a French author and an important disciple of "The Mother" who published Mother's Agenda (1982), Sri Aurobindo or the Adventure of Consciousness (2000), On the Way to Supermanhood (2002) and more.
- Indra Sen (1903–1994) was another disciple of Sri Aurobindo who, although little-known in the West, was the first to articulate integral psychology and integral philosophy, in the 1940s and 1950s. A compilation of his papers came out under the title, Integral Psychology in 1986.
- K. D. Sethna (1904–2011) was an Indian poet, scholar, writer, cultural critic and disciple of Sri Aurobindo. For several decades he was the editor of the Ashram journal Mother India.
- Margaret Woodrow Wilson (Nistha) (1886–1944), daughter of US President Woodrow Wilson, came to the ashram in 1938 and stayed there until her death. She helped to prepare a revised edition of The Life Divine.
- Xu Fancheng (Hsu Hu) (26 October 1909, Changsha – 6 March 2000, Beijing), Chinese Sanskrit scholar, came to Ashram in 1951 and became a devotee of Sri Aurobindo and a follower of The Mother. For 27 years (1951–78) he lived at Pondicherry and devoted himself to translating the complete works of Sri Aurobindo under the guidance of The Mother.

== In popular culture ==
The 1970 Indian Bengali-language biographical drama film Mahabiplabi Aurobindo, directed by Dipak Gupta, depicted Sri Aurobindo's life on screen. On the 72nd Republic Day of India, the Ministry of Culture presented a tableau on his life. On 15 August 2023, a short animation film Sri Aurobindo: A New Dawn was released.

== Literature ==
=== Indian editions ===
- A first edition of collected works was published in 1972 in 30 volumes: Sri Aurobindo Birth Centenary Library (SABCL), Pondicherry: Sri Aurobindo Ashram.
- A new edition of collected works was started in 1995. Currently, 36 out of 37 volumes have been published: Complete Works of Sri Aurobindo (CWSA). Pondicherry: Sri Aurobindo Ashram.

=== American edition ===
==== Main works ====
- Sri Aurobindo Primary Works Set 12 vol. US Edition, Lotus Press, Twin Lakes, Wisconsin ISBN 0-941524-93-0
- Sri Aurobindo Selected Writings Software CD-ROM, Lotus Press, Twin Lakes, Wisconsin ISBN 0-914955-88-8
- The Life Divine, Lotus Press, Twin Lakes, Wisconsin ISBN 0-941524-61-2
- Savitri: A Legend and a Symbol, Lotus Press, Twin Lakes, Wisconsin ISBN 0-941524-80-9
- The Synthesis of Yoga, Lotus Press, Twin Lakes, Wisconsin ISBN 0-941524-65-5
- Essays on the Gita, Lotus Press, Twin Lakes, Wisconsin ISBN 0-914955-18-7
- The Ideal of Human Unity, Lotus Press, Twin Lakes, Wisconsin ISBN 0-914955-43-8
- The Human Cycle: The Psychology of Social Development, Lotus Press, Twin Lakes, Wisconsin ISBN 0-914955-44-6
- The Human Cycle, Ideal of Human Unity, War and Self Determination, Lotus Press. ISBN 81-7058-014-5
- The Upanishads, Lotus Press, Twin Lakes, Wisconsin ISBN 0-914955-23-3
- Secret of the Veda, Lotus Press, Twin Lakes, Wisconsin ISBN 0-914955-19-5
- Hymns to the Mystic Fire, Lotus Press, Twin Lakes, Wisconsin ISBN 0-914955-22-5
- The Mother, Lotus Press, Twin Lakes, Wisconsin ISBN 0-941524-79-5

==== Compilations and secondary literature ====
- The Integral Yoga: Sri Aurobindo's Teaching and Method of Practice, Lotus Press, Twin Lakes, Wisconsin ISBN 0-941524-76-0
- The Future Evolution of Man, Lotus Press, Twin Lakes, Wisconsin ISBN 0-940985-55-1
- The Essential Aurobindo – Writings of Sri Aurobindo ISBN 978-0-9701097-2-9
- Bhagavad Gita and Its Message, Lotus Press, Twin Lakes, Wisconsin ISBN 0-941524-78-7
- The Mind of Light, Lotus Press, Twin Lakes, Wisconsin ISBN 0-940985-70-5
- Rebirth and Karma, Lotus Press, Twin Lakes, Wisconsin ISBN 0-941524-63-9
- Hour of God by Sri Aurobindo, Lotus Press. ISBN 81-7058-217-2
- Dictionary of Sri Aurobindo's Yoga, (compiled by M. P. Pandit), Lotus Press, Twin Lakes, Wisconsin ISBN 0-941524-74-4
- Vedic Symbolism, Lotus Press, Twin Lakes, Wisconsin ISBN 0-941524-30-2
- The Powers Within, Lotus Press. ISBN 978-0-941524-96-4
- Reading Sri Aurobindo, Penguin Random House India. ISBN 978-0670097036

=== Comparative studies ===
- Hemsell, Rod (Oct. 2014). The Philosophy of Evolution. Auro-e-Books, E-Book
- Hemsell, Rod (Dec. 2014). Sri Aurobindo and the Logic of the Infinite: Essays for the New Millennium. Auro-e-Books, E-Book
- Hemsell, Rod (2017). The Philosophy of Consciousness: Hegel and Sri Aurobindo. E-Book
- Huchzermeyer, Wilfried (Oct. 2018). Sri Aurobindo’s Commentaries on Krishna, Buddha, Christ and Ramakrishna. Their Role in the Evolution of Humanity. edition sawitri, E-Book
- Johnston, David T. (Nov. 2016) Jung's Global Vision: Western Psyche, Eastern Mind, With References to Sri Aurobindo, Integral Yoga, The Mother. Agio Publishing House, ISBN 9781927755211
- Johnston, David T. (Dec. 2016). Prophets in Our Midst: Jung, Tolkien, Gebser, Sri Aurobindo and the Mother. Universe, E-Book
- Singh, Satya Prakash (2013). Nature of God. A Comparative Study in Sri Aurobindo and Whitehead. Antrik Express Digital, E-Book
- Singh, Satya Prakash (2005). Sri Aurobindo, Jung and Vedic Yoga. Mira Aditi Centre, ISBN 9788187471127
- Eric M. Weiss (2003): The Doctrine of the Subtle Worlds. Sri Aurobindo’s Cosmology, Modern Science and the Metaphysics of Alfred North Whitehead, Dissertation (PDF; 1,3 MB), California Institute of Integral Studies, San Francisco

== See also ==
- Integral psychology
