= Savitri: A Legend and a Symbol =

Epic poem by Sri Aurobindo

- Author: Sri Aurobindo
- Publication date: 1950

Savitri: A Legend and a Symbol is an epic poem in blank verse by Sri Aurobindo. Consisting of nearly 24,000 lines, it is based on the legend of Savitri and Satyavan in the Mahabharata, which Sri Aurobindo reinterpreted as a symbolic myth of the Vedic cycle. Sri Aurobindo described the work as a "symbolic epic of the aim of supramental Yoga". It narrates the spiritual ascent of the king Aswapati (the Lord of Tapasya) to the highest planes of consciousness to bring down a divine power, and the subsequent birth and yoga of Savitri (the Divine Word) who must descend into the grip of death and ignorance to conquer them. The poem was written as an experiment in "mantric" poetry, intended to express a direct vision from the "Overhead" planes of consciousness.

== Origins ==
Sri Aurobindo composed his poem over a long period of time. At first he worked on the narrative of Savitri as such, with the first manuscript dating back to 1916. Around 1930 he began turning it into an epic with a larger scope and deeper meaning. It now became his major literary work and he continued to expand and perfect it until his last days. In 1946 some Cantos started to appear in print in the Sri Aurobindo Ashram, and in 1950 the First Part of the first edition was published. The remaining parts were brought out the next year, after Sri Aurobindo's passing. Sri Aurobindo's disciple and secretary, the physician Nirodbaran, gives a detailed account on the genesis of Savitri in his title Twelve Years with Sri Aurobindo. He describes the poet's long work on the epic and reports that there were “many versions, plenty of revisions, additions, subtractions, emendations from which the final version was made.” Referring to a letter from Sri Aurobindo, Nirodbaran also mentions that he used Savitri as “a means of ascension” by recording his personal experiences which went on developing and resulted in all those revisions.

== Background ==
In writing this poem, Aurobindo was deeply affected by Milton's work, regarding it as among the five great epics of western literature (along with the Iliad, the Odyssey, the Aeneid, and the Divine Comedy). However, he believed it painted a picture of Satan to a much more competent extent than it did God, and he believed after the first three books it dropped starkly in quality. Nevertheless, he took from Milton the idea of blank verse, on which he applied regularity rather than repeat the way Milton deliberately broke from this model, to create what he called a mantric meter. He regarded his own poem as a form of the epic for the future, more intimate in detail than the epics of the past.

== Contents ==
The underlying legend of Savitri and Satyavan is told in the Mahabharata where it has a length of 300 verses. Taking up this relatively short episode, Sri Aurobindo develops it into an epic poem of nearly 24000 lines with 12 Books and 49 Cantos. Thus, the original tale of conjugal fidelity is changed into a story of human liberation from Ignorance, Unconsciousness and Death through the divine grace descending on Earth in the form of Savitri. According to his own testimony, Sri Aurobindo is describing here his own spiritual odyssey and his efforts to reach a new, higher stage of evolution.

In the process he refers to a large number of subjects from the fields of history, geography, science, poetry and philosophy or treats the origin of the universe and humans. Moreover, he treats all kinds of yogic practices and especially the path of integral yoga. While the First Part (Books I-III) mainly focusses on the Yoga of King Aswapati, the Second and Third Parts especially deal with the meeting of Savitri and Satyavan, their intense love and Savitri's battle with Yama, the God of Death, when he comes to take Satyavan's soul and faces her indomitable resistance.

== Comparison with Vyasa’s legend ==
There are various differences between the original story and Sri Aurobindo's version, which can be illustrated by the following examples:

In the legend Savitri is described as an exceptional girl of great beauty, like Shrī, the Goddess of Fortune herself, but she is not presented as a divine incarnation. In contrast, in Sri Aurobindo's epic King Aswapati prays to the Divine Mother that she may embody herself on earth, and Savitri, her incarnation, is described as a girl not only of rare beauty, but is also said to acquire comprehensive knowledge of many philosophies, sciences, arts and crafts.

Furthermore, in the legend it says that Aswapati feels distressed when he sees that his exceptional daughter remains unmarried since no prince dares to approach her because of her radiance. Therefore, the king asks his daughter to go out and seek a suitable companion herself. In comparison, Sri Aurobindo presents Aswapati as an accomplished yogi with a strong aspiration for a perfect life on earth, envisioning his daughter as the one who will realize this fulfilment. The king senses by intuition that she has not come alone, but that there must be a companion somewhere, destined to help her carrying out that mission, and for this specific purpose he sends her out. She spends a whole year on this journey, having manifold experiences and meeting various kinds of Rishis and seekers, until she finally discovers Satyavan in a forest grove.

== Symbolism ==
Sri Aurobindo believed that even the original tale had some deeper significance, although it got lost over time. He was convinced that some names give a clue to the true meaning of the story as revealed in his epic. Thus, Satyavan is derived from Sanskrit satya-vān, that is to say “one who carries the Truth”. As such he descends on earth, encountering its darkness. Sāvitrī means “the daughter of Savitṛ”, the Creator and creative splendour, the divine Grace in human form. Aswapati stands for aśva-pati, lit. the “Lord of the Horse”, which in Sri Aurobindo's interpretation means “Lord of the Force”, master of spiritual power, light and strength. Satyavan's father is Dyumatsena, from Sanskrit dyumat-sena, “the shining host”, which Sri Aurobindo interprets as the divine mind full of the rays of light. In the legend, the king is a blind man, exiled from his own kingdom due to certain circumstances, which in Sri Aurobindo's opinion refers to Dyumatsena's mind being temporarily exiled from his own kingdom of light and coming to the earth, blinded by Ignorance. In this way, Sri Aurobindo arrived at his own conclusions regarding the meaning of the legend and called his new creation “Savitri – A Legend and a Symbol”.

== Metre and Inspiration ==
Sri Aurobindo has written his epic poem in blank verse, which is a very flexible metre allowing manifold variations of cadence and rhythm. But K.D. Sethna, a poet and disciple of Sri Aurobindo, notes that the freedom of this metre “does not cut any modernistic zigzag of irregularity”. Sri Aurobindo would reject any kind of free verse without underlying and unifying rhythm. He further explains that Savitri adopts, with some adaptations, the iambic five-foot line of English blank verse as the most apt and plastic medium for this specific type of inspiration. He adds that independent text blocks with a kind of self-sufficient structure are characteristic of Sri Aurobindo's style, and states that his verses get a special sound and "mantric" force, because he is writing from intuitive planes beyond the mind.

== Literature ==
=== Indian editions ===
Sri Aurobindo's original text has been brought out as vols. 33 and 34 of the Complete Works of Sri Aurobindo (CWSA) as well as various one-volume editions:

- Sri Aurobindo, Savitri. A Legend and a Symbol. Pondicherry, Sri Aurobindo Ashram 1997

=== American edition ===
- Savitri: A Legend and a Symbol, Lotus Press, Twin Lakes, Wisconsin ISBN 0-941524-80-9

=== Secondary literature ===
- D. S. Mishra (1989), Poetry and philosophy in Sri Aurobindo's Savitri ISBN 81-85151-21-0
- M.P. Pandit (2000), Introducing Savitri, Dipti Publications, Pondicherry
- Jugal Kishore Mukherjee (2001), The ascent of sight in Sri Aurobindo's Savitri ISBN 81-7058-656-9
- K.D. Sethna (2008), The Poetic Genius of Sri Aurobindo, Clear Ray Trust, Puducherry
- A. B. Purani (2009), Sri Aurobindo’s Savitri: An Approach and a Study (4th Edition), Sri Aurobindo Ashram, Pondicherry ISBN 978-8170586838
- Mangesh V. Nadkarni (2012), Savitri. The Golden Bridge, the Wonderful Fire. An Introduction to Sri Aurobindo’s epic. Savitri Bhavan, Auroville
- Shraddhavan (2017-2022), The English of Savitri, vols. 1–12, Savitri Bhavan, Auroville
