= Sri Aurobindo Ashram =

Spiritual community in Pondicherry

Sri Aurobindo Ashram Ashram de Sri Aurobindo
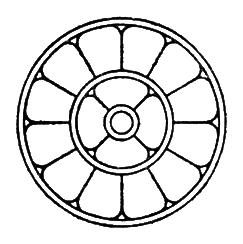
- The Mother's symbol

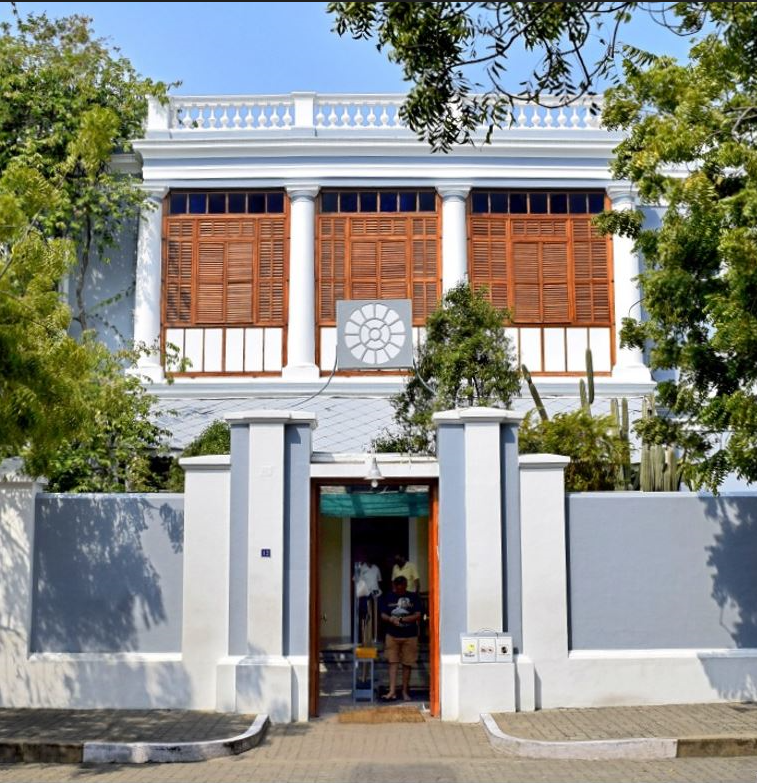
- Sri Aurobindo Ashram entrance
- Formation: 24 November 1926 (99 years ago)
- Founder: The Mother, Sri Aurobindo
- Type: Spiritual community
- Legal status: Foundation
- Headquarters: Pondicherry, India (No Branches)
- Coordinates: 11.936708°N 79.834039°E
- Main organ: Sri Aurobindo Ashram Trust
- Website: sriaurobindoashram.org

The Sri Aurobindo Ashram is a spiritual community and ashram in Pondicherry (Puducherry), India. It was founded in 1926 by the Indian philosopher Sri Aurobindo and his spiritual collaborator Mirra Alfassa, known as "The Mother". Over the years, the Ashram which also houses the samadhi of Sri Aurobindo and the Mother, became the institutional centre of a modern spiritual movement based on Sri Aurobindo’s Integral Yoga. It became one of India’s best-known spiritual communities, attracting devotees and visitors from around the world.

There are about 1,200 people who are part of the Ashram, and their school, called the Sri Aurobindo International Centre of Education, has over 400 students. The Ashram is situated in an urban environment, where Integral Yoga taught by Sri Aurobindo is a major focus of the community.

== Locale ==
The Ashram is located mainly in the eastern part of Pondicherry, the former French quarter in which many French-colonial style buildings are still standing. The Ashram owns a large number of buildings spread throughout the area — houses in which Ashram members live and buildings in which they work. There are, in addition, several farms and gardens, some on the outskirts of Pondicherry.

The heart of community life is the Ashram main building, often called simply "the Ashram". It consists of an interconnected block of houses, including those in which Sri Aurobindo and the Mother lived for most of their lives. At its centre is a tree-shaded courtyard where stands the "Samadhi", a white-marble shrine in which their bodies have been laid to rest. From this square block of buildings, other Ashram buildings spread out on all sides.

== Spiritual practice ==
Central to Ashram life, of course, is the inner spiritual endeavour. Certain aspects of practice are essential to the Yoga and common to all: an aspiration for the divine life, rejection of the impulses of the lower nature, consecration of one's whole being, opening to the Divine Presence and Power, and self-giving to the Divine and its working in oneself. As for the expression of these principles in one's sadhana, it can take many forms. Sri Aurobindo regarded Yoga as an individual practice, with individual sadhana creating a collective atmosphere; the Ashram provided a setting for transforming "the inner and outer individual and collective life".

For this reason, there are in the Ashram no obligatory outer practices, no established rituals, no compulsory meditations, no systematic instructions in Yoga. Ashram members are free to determine the course and pace of their sadhana in accord with their nature. In theory and in practice, a great deal of freedom is given to the sadhaks to find their spiritual way. Heehs notes that Sri Aurobindo stated that there is no "communal sadhana", and individual practice creates a collective spiritual atmosphere, emphasizing individual sadhana,

== Departments, services and administration ==
The Ashram provides its members with all they need for a sound and healthy life. Various departments and services have been organised to look after the basic requirements of food, clothing and shelter, medical and dental care. There are also two libraries for study, three grounds for physical activities, and a number of facilities for cultural pursuits. The Ashram has its own printing press and book distribution agency. There are several guest houses for visitors.

The Ashram is a public charitable trust. It is administered by a five-member board of trustees. The trustees appoint the heads of the various departments, services, farms and gardens. The work of the various departments is coordinated by the trustees and the committees formed by them. The Ashram school — the Sri Aurobindo International Centre of Education — is an integral part of the Ashram Trust. After the Mother's death in 1973, no spiritual successor was selected and the trustees assumed day-to-day administration. Practitioners continued to follow Sri Aurobindo's and the Mother's written guidance.

== See also ==
- Auroville
- Matrimandir
