= Barra Funda (district of São Paulo) =

District of São Paulo, Brazil

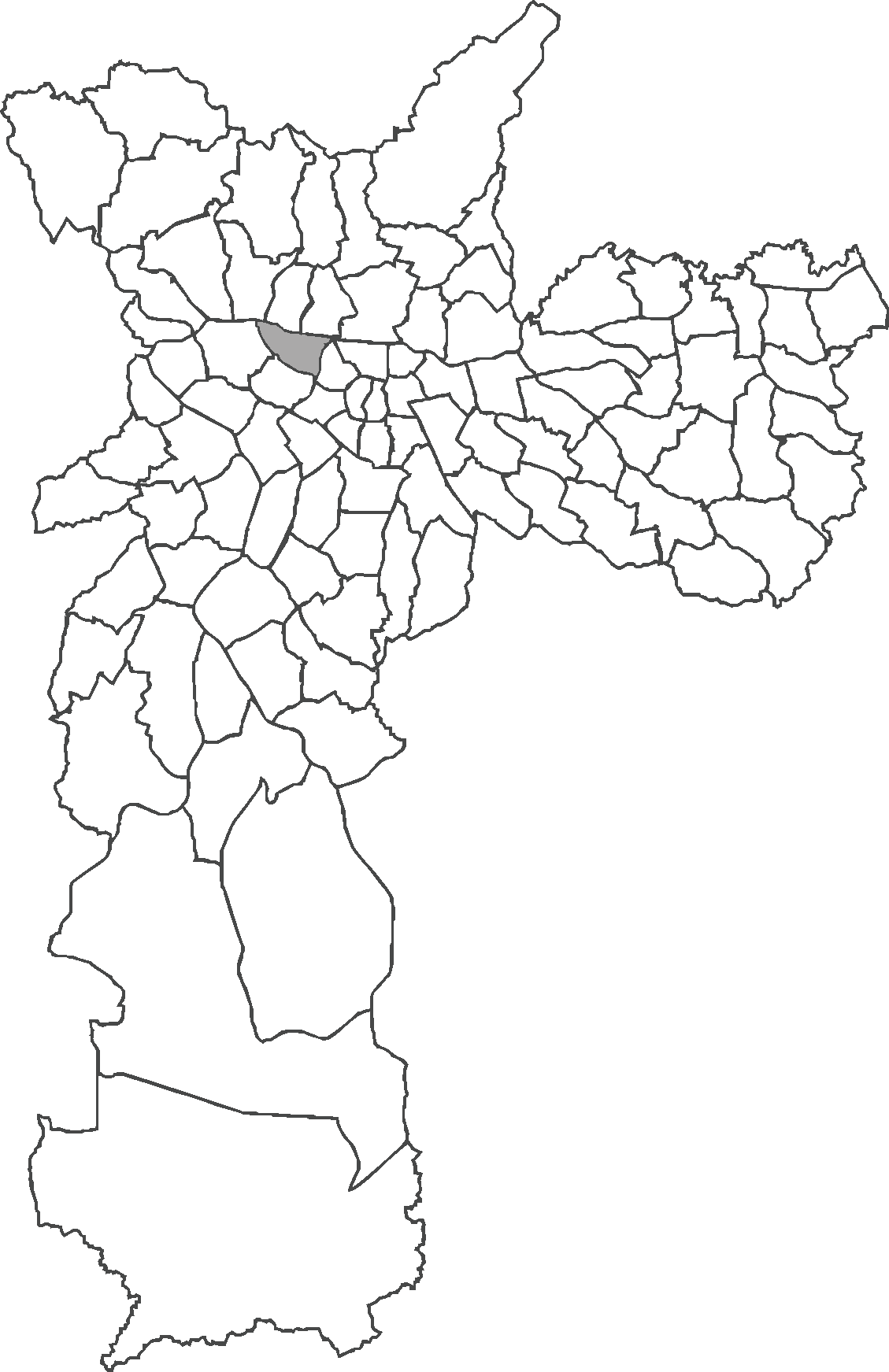
- Location in the city of São Paulo
- Interactive map of Barra Funda
- Country: Brazil
- State: São Paulo
- City: São Paulo
- Administrative zone: West Zone
- Subprefecture: Lapa

Government
  - Type: Subprefecture
  - Subprefect: Danilo Antão Fernandes

Area
  - Total: 5.85 km^{2} (2.26 sq mi)

Population (2022)
  - Total: 33.436
  - Density: 5.72/km^{2} (14.8/sq mi)
- HDI: 0.906 – very high
- Average income: R$ 4,100 (US$ 760.67)
- Website: Subprefecture of Lapa

Barra Funda is a district in the subprefecture of Lapa, São Paulo, Brazil. It comprises an area of 5.85 square kilometres (2.26 sq mi) and is part of the official administrative division of the state capital, which is made up of 96 districts. The district is located in the West Zone of São Paulo and is known for its cultural and sports facilities, as well as its diverse socioeconomic profile. According to the Atlas of Human Development of Brazil, it has a Municipal Human Development Index (MHDI) of 0.906 (as of 2010), considered very high and above the municipal average.

== Etymology ==
The name "Barra Funda" (lit. 'Deep Bar') might have a geographical origin, referring to referring to the sandy riverbanks along the Tietê River, in a low-lying, marshy floodplain area, hence the adjective "funda" ("deep"). The term was already in use in the 19th century, designating the floodplains and lowlands near the Tietê. According to this etymology, the name reflects the natural characteristics of the area, which is subject to flooding.

Another possible etymology derives from the Italian word baraonda (or, in Portuguese, barafonda), used to describe a confusing or chaotic place.

== History ==
The Barra Funda region appears in 19th-century records, linked to the former farmsteads and rural properties that bordered the Tietê River. The district was officially recognized as an administrative zone by State Decree No. 9,859-A of 23 December 1938, with its creation consolidated by Municipal Law No. 10,932 of 15 January 1991 and its boundaries confirmed by Law No. 11,220 of 20 May 1992.

=== Origins and urbanization ===
During the colonial period and the early 19th century, the Barra Funda area was made up of large rural properties and small farms, such as the Chácara do Carvalho that belonged to Antônio da Silva Prado, the Baron of Iguape. These properties extended to the Tietê floodplain and were critical to the initial occupation of the region and the formation of the district's first urban centers later on. From the second half of the 19th century onward, the farms were subdivided into lots, originating the first streets and to the urbanization of the territory.

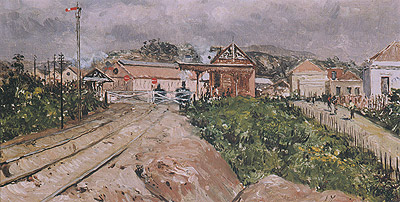
Estação Barra Funda by Antonio Ferrigno, c. 1893 - 1905

Consequently, the urbanization of Barra Funda intensified from the 1870s onward, with the subdivision of the former farms and the opening of streets such as Brigadeiro Galvão, Barra Funda and Vitorino Carmilo. The district received a large amount of Italian, Spanish and Portuguese immigrants, drawn by the proximity of the rail lines and the new industries. Along with Luz, it was also home to the majority of the black and mixed-race population in São Paulo in the early 20th century, especially in the region known as "Largo da Banana".

Industrialization consolidated in the beginning of the 20th century, with new factories and industrial warehouses, given the low cost of the land and the proximity of the railway. The first inauguration of the Barra Funda Station in 1892, by the São Paulo Railway Company, was a milestone for the development of the district, facilitating the transport of goods and workers. The district consisted mainly of working-class housing, including cortiços, villages and other low-income housing.

Casa das Caldeiras, part of the Indústrias Reunidas Fábricas Matarazzo industrial complex, is a listed building in the Barra Funda district

The SE Palmeiras (then Palestra Italia), founded by Italian factory workers, bought the Parque Antarctica stadium (present-day Nubank Parque) in Barra Funda in the 1920s.

Some of the factories established in the region at the time were the glass manufacturers Vidraria Santa Marina (1897) and Cristaleria Paulista (1905). Later on, during the 1920s and 30s, new and bigger factories were inaugurated, such as Divani (paper mill) and L. Queiróz (lança-perfume manufacturer).

=== Mid and late 20th century ===
Between the 1940s and 1980s, Barra Funda underwent a transition from an industrial neighborhood to a mixed-use area. To some extent, the district experienced industrial decline, due to government incentives for factories to be established elsewhere. Some old buildings, such as the Casa das Caldeiras, were turned into cultural and service centers later on.

The inauguration of important mobility and cultural facilities, such as the Palmeiras–Barra Funda Intermodal Terminal (1989), the Barra Funda Metro Station (Line 3 (Red), initially called the East-West line, 1988), and the Latin America Memorial (1989), designed by Oscar Niemeyer, all took place in the 1980s.

The PlayCenter amusement park in 2007

In 1973, one of the most famous amusement parks in São Paulo was established in Barra Funda. The "PlayCenter" had a total area of 85,000 m^{2} (910,000 square feet) and featured several entertainment activities and exhibitions, becoming a city landmark in the following years. The park shut down in 2012, with an estimate of 60 million visitors during its operation time.

Slowly kicked off in the 1970s, the verticalization process of Barra Funda intesified from the 2000s onward, with the construction of residential and commercial buildings replacing former industrial areas. However, the district landscape still consists of a mix of historical and modern buildings. In 2013, the district was included in the Água Branca Operation (Law No. 15,893/2013), which provides incentives for urban requalification, road improvements and the expansion of green areas, besides allowing the construction of buildings of up to 27 floors. Recent urban legislation (Law No. 18,177/2024) kept areas of the district classified as ZEIS-3, a classification system aimed at ensuring housing for low-income families.

== Geography ==
The Barra Funda district, in the western part of São Paulo, and its neighboring districts. The highlighted districts make up the Subprefecture of Lapa

Barra Funda is a district with an official area of 5.85 square kilometres (2.26 sq mi) and is part of the official administrative division of the state capital, made up of 96 districts. The district is bordered to the north by the Tietê River, to the east by Santa Cecília and Bom Retiro, to the south by Perdizes, and to the west by Lapa, being run through by major highways such as the Marginal Tietê and Avenida Marquês de São Vicente. Its geographic boundaries are defined by municipal legislation, most notably Law No. 11,220/1992, which consolidated the administrative division. The district is part of the Lapa subprefecture, in the western region of the city.

Barra Funda is set within an alluvial plain of the Tietê River, characterized by predominantly flat relief and floodplains. Average altitudes range from 720 to 730 m (2,360 to 2,400 feet) above sea level, with some small streams coming from higher elevations near the site. The flat relief played an important role in the installation of railways and factories, as well as in accelerating urbanization from the late 19th century onward.

A pond in the Água Branca Park, located in the Água Branca neighborhood

The main watercourse of the district is the Tietê River, which borders Barra Funda to the north and northwest. However, most streams and brooks part of the Tietê system in the Lapa subprefecture were channelized in the 20th century to mitigate recurrent flooding and allow urban expansion. Some of the relevant watercourses altered by urbanization are the Cortume, Água Branca, Água Preta, Sumaré, Quirino dos Santos and Pacaembú streams. These waterbodies are part of small drainage basins with most watercourses currently underground or channelized.

It is historically vulnerable to flooding due to its location in a floodplain area and its fragile soil. In addition, there are records of degraded areas and atmospheric and noise pollution, associated with heavy traffic. According to the 2025 Inequality Map, the emission of atmospheric pollutants is 0.63 kg/km²/day, the 4th highest emission rate among the 96 districts of São Paulo.

Partial view of the district.

The district has limited vegetation cover, with few green areas. There are two places officially listed as Special Environmental Preservation Zones (ZEPAM): Jardim das Perdizes Park and, the most notable one, the Água Branca Park. The Água Branca Park was inaugurated in 1929 and is open to visitors. According to a study published in the late 1990s, it has around 159 tree species and 38 bird species.

Barra Funda is encompasses neighborhoods such as Barra Funda, Vila Barra Funda, Vila Chalote, Vila dos Ferroviários and Água Branca (partially). Even though these subdivisions are often seen on maps, they are not official. Since 1992, São Paulo is officcialy divided into 96 administrative districts, with Barra Funda being one of them. Traditionally, the region was divided into Barra Funda de Baixo (or Várzea da Barra Funda) and Barra Funda de Cima, each with its own characteristics of urbanization and land use through the years.

== Demographics and socioeconomic profile ==
According to the IBGE 2022 Census, the district's total population is 33.436 inhabitants, distributed across an area of 5.85 km^{2} (2.26 square miles), resulting in a population density of 5.72 inhabs./km². Between 2010 and 2022, the district's population grew by 132.5%, the largest increase among the 96 districts of São Paulo, driven by verticalization and new developments.

Demographic evolution of the Barra Funda district

According to data from 2020, the district registered a decrease in the elderly population from 2010 to 2020, while the young population increased 19.06% in the same period. Historically, Barra Funda has experienced population fluctuations marked by periods of growth and decline, especially with changes in land use and urban transformations. In the 21th century, population growth has been observed, accompanied by an increase in schooling and average income.

The demographic composition of Barra Funda started with a significant number of immigrants. By the end of the 19th century, the district received many European immigrants, especially Italians from the Veneto region, attracted by the proximity of the railways, factories and, therefore, job opportunities. The Italian presence was very prominent in the city at the time and the founding of the Palestra Italia soccer team (present-day Sociedade Esportiva Palmeiras) in 1914 is part of its heritage, which is also expressed in cultural associations and architecture.

Apart from being known as an "Italian working-class neighborhood", Barra Funda was also home to a large portion of the black and mixed-race population in São Paulo in the early 20th century. This demographic was also attracted by the newly built railways and the opportunity to sell their goods at train stations. The African influence in the district was decisive for the music scene in São Paulo, leading to the founding of the samba school "Grupo Carnavalesco Barra Funda" (present day Camisa Verde e Branco) in 1914 by Dionísio Barbosa. Thus, the Barra Funda region is considered the "birthplace of the São Paulo samba". Despite its early demographic being made up by different groups, 80% of the district population was white in 2020. This rate is higher than the 54.3% reported for the entire city in the 2022 census.

The São Geraldo das Perdizes Parish

The area’s religious composition is also diverse, with Catholicism represented by historical parishes such as the Santo Antônio da Barra Funda and the São Geraldo das Perdizes parishes. There are also evangelical churches of different denominations, such as the Foursquare Gospel Church, as well as spiritism centers and Afro-Brazilian religious facilities.

The district's Municipal Human Development Index (MHDI), calculated for the Lapa subprefecture unit, was 0.906 in 2010, classified as very high and above the average of the city of São Paulo (0.805). Other relevant indicators include infant mortality of 6.29% per thousand live births, teenage pregnancy of 2.2% and an average age life expectancy of 75 years. The district also records 58.36 families receiving provisional housing assistance due to situations of risk and emergency.

The district has areas classified as ZEIS-3 (Special Zones of Social Interest), intended for social housing, as well as commercial and other residential zones (ZC, ZM, ZEU), which allow greater densification and the construction of tall buildings, especially along transport corridors.

=== Economy ===
Industrial remnants of the district.

It is one of the most dynamic districts of the municipality of São Paulo in economic terms, standing out for the diversity of its sectors and real-estate appreciation. The Lapa subprefecture, where Barra Funda is located, is considered a hub for many services, communication, logistics, culture, business centers, large companies and facilities for events and tourism. As of 2023, Barra Funda's average formal employment monthly income is R$ 4,100 (US$ 760.67), slightly higher than the average R$ 3,598.55 (US$ 667.63) of the 96 districts. It ranks 4th place among the other districts in the availability of formal jobs in São Paulo, with around 45 formal jobs for every ten working-age inhabitants, an index far above the municipal average (9).

The Latin America Memorial and new real-estate developments.

The economy is predominantly driven by the tertiary sector, with a significant presence of communication, technology, culture, education, events, logistics and transport companies. Industry was the leading sector until the mid-20th century, however, most warehouses and small factories became cultural centers.

There are also headquarters and operations of large business groups such as the Record national headquarters, located at Teatro Dermeval Gonçalves, and the São Paulo State Government TV Cultura headquarters in the Água Branca neighborhood.

==== Real estate market ====
The real estate market of Barra Funda has grown stronger in the 21st century, driven by verticalization, proximity to the city center and transport infrastructure. The average sale price of new launches in 2025 was R$ 10,739 (US$ 1920.08) per square meter, while the average resale price was R$ 11,604 (US$ 2074.74) per square meter. In 2024, nearly 5,000 new residential units were inaugurated, mostly compact apartments aimed at first-time buyers and investors.

These launches are led by large construction companies and the highest price per square meter is in the Jardim das Perdizes planned neighborhood, where it can exceed R$ 16,000 (US$ 2860.72). According to specialists, changes in the zoning law were fundamental to the attraction of real estate investment.

== Public administration and security ==
The district is part of the regional administration of the Lapa Subprefecture, one of the 32 subprefectures of the city government, responsible for territorial management, urban maintenance, oversight, public services and the implementation of local policies. Additionally, the Lapa Community Security Council (CONSEG) is a community-based organization that seeks to discuss and propose public security actions in the territory.

Regarding electoral organization, Barra Funda belongs to the 250th Electoral Zone of São Paulo, responsible for the organization and supervision of electoral processes in the district, including voter registration.

There are two police stations in the Barra Funda District: the Department of Strategic Police Operations (DOPE) and the São Paulo Judicial Police Department (DECAP). There is also a branch of the Specialized Tourist Assistance Division (DEATUR) at the DOPE station.

Barra Funda's crime rates are slightly below the municipal average for homicides, with a rate of 6.25 per 100,000 inhabitants, compared to 6.41 per 100,000 in the city of São Paulo. However, the racial violence rate is 7.95 per thousand inhabitants, higher than the 2.98 average for all districts. Even though records of robberies and thefts have shown a downward trend in recent years (as of 2026), the cell phone theft rates on Marginal Tietê are still higher than most cities in the São Paulo state.

== Infrastructure ==
Palmeiras-Barra Funda metro station (Line 3 Red)

The Barra Funda district is known for its diverse urban landscape, including tall buildings, old warehouses, cafes, restaurants, cultural facilities and nightclubs. It is also one of the city's main urban mobility hubs, with a wide range of public transport. The Palmeiras–Barra Funda Intermodal Terminal integrates municipal, intermunicipal and interstate bus lines, as well as train and metro lines 3 (Red), 8 (Diamond), 7 (Ruby),10 (Turquoise), 11 (Coral) and the Guarulhos Airport Express. The bus terminal serves about 40,000 passengers per day and is essential for the connection between different regions of the city and the state. The region also has bike paths and bike lanes. Since the first half of 2026, Line 6 (Orange) of the São Paulo Metro also has a station in the district.

The Água Branca Park, located in the homonym neighborhood, is an environmental preservation area open for leisure activities such as food and artistic fairs, horseback riding and concerts. It also features an aquarium, a library and the Valdemar Lefèvre Geological Museum.

Barra Funda's landscape has changed a lot, especially given the rapid surge of vertical condominiums in recent decades. Besides social housing programs, such as the ZEIS-3 zoning areas, luxurious new buildings have been built in planned neighborhoods within Barra Funda. This quick real estate appreciation has also led to discussions on gentrification and loss regional history.

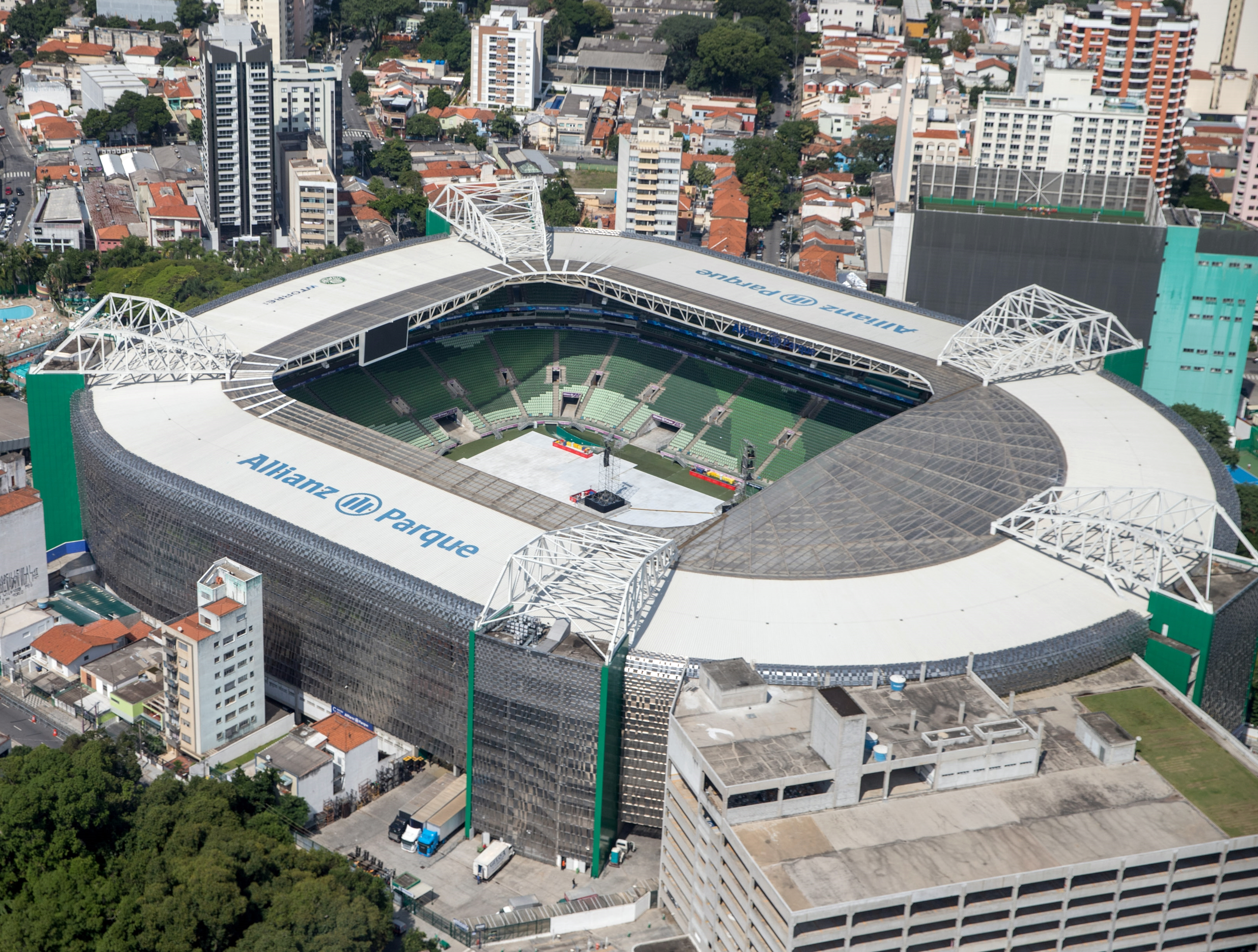
Aerial view of Nubank Parque

Commerce is diversified, including shopping centers West Plaza and Bourbon, both near Nubank Parque. The cuisine of Barra Funda is diverse and includes restaurants such as Komah (contemporary Korean cuisine, Bib Gourmand designation) and Laska (Mediterranean and Ethiopian cuisine).

=== Culture ===
Barra Funda has been internationally recognized as a reference in cultural and business tourism. In 2025, the Time Out magazine ranked the Barra Funda neighborhood the "third-coolest in the world" for its nightlife, landscape and culture. According to the editor Lívia Brenes, "in the same block, you’ll find concrete, train tracks and a cult nightclub".

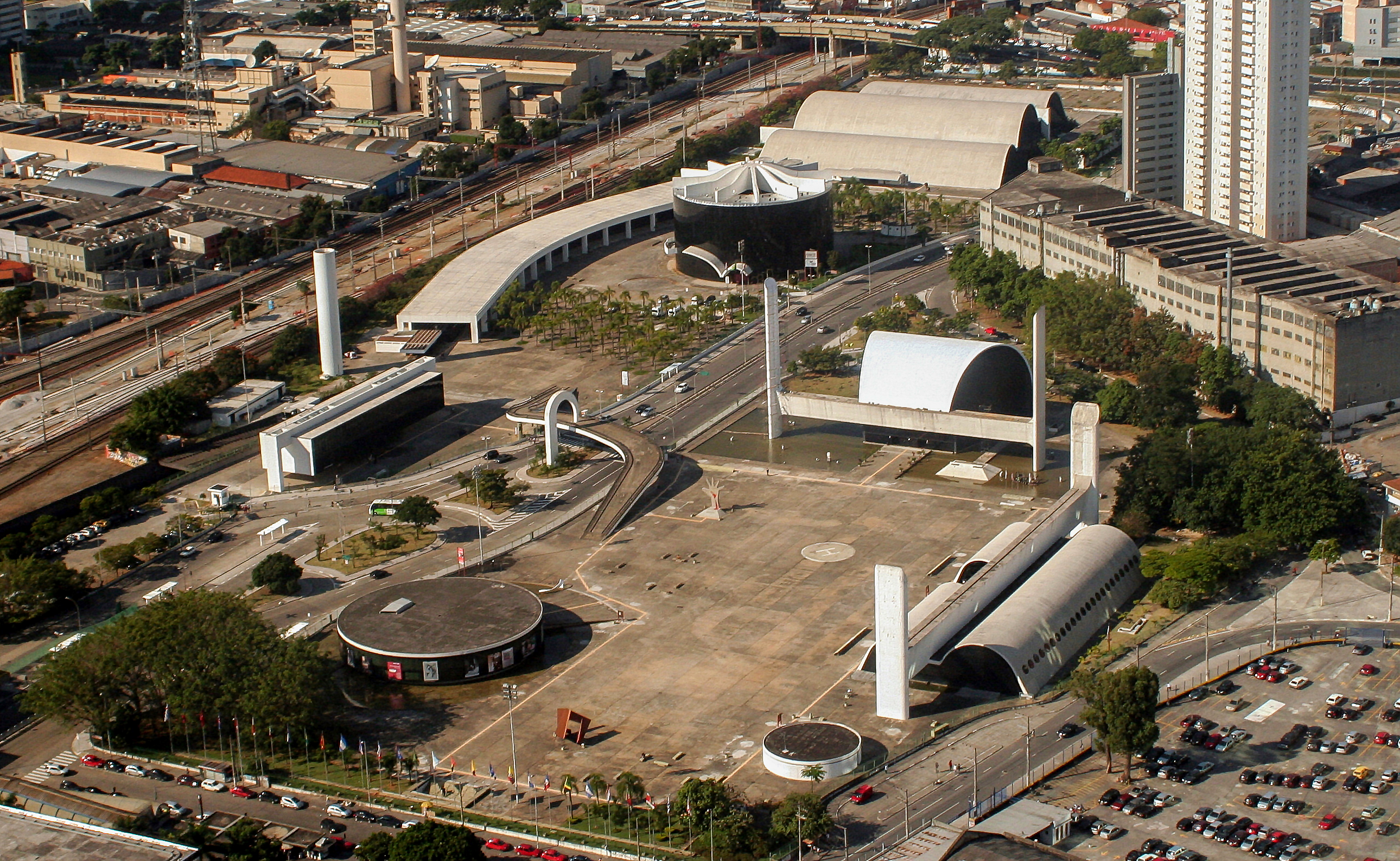
The Latin America Memorial

Some of the most popular cultural facilities found in the district are:

- The Latin America Memorial, an architectural complex designed by Oscar Niemeyer made up of several buildings with a total built area of 25,210 m^{2} (271,400 sq ft), including the Victor Civita Latin American Library. The Memorial was inaugurated in 1989 and hosts exhibitions, concerts, gastronomic festivals, literary fairs, congresses and music festivals. From 1989 to 2007, it also served as a headquarter to the Latin American Parliament;
- Nubank Parque, located in the Água Branca neighborhood, one of the region's main event hubs, with a capacity of up to 43,713 people for soccer events and 55,000 people concerts. The stadium, previously known as Allianz Parque, is the home of SE Palmeiras and not only hosts sport events but also national and international music concerts, such as Paul McCartney's Out There Tour in 2014 and Taylor Swift's The Eras Tour in 2023;
- Espaço Unimed, formerly known as Espaço das Américas, one of the largest performance and event venues in São Paulo. It has a capacity for up to 8,000 people and has hosted national and international concerts;
- Villa Country, inaugurated in 2002 on Francisco Matarazzo Avenue, is a sertanejo music concert venue featuring bars, a restaurant, a clothing store and a cafe;
- Teatro São Pedro, inaugurated in 1917 and listed by CONDEPHAAT in 1980, the second oldest theater in São Paulo. Initially a movie theater, it also hosts concerts, ballet recitals, operas and different genres of plays;
- Casa Mário de Andrade, former house of the writer Mário de Andrade and a building listed by CONPRESP. Since 2018, the house is a museum dedicated to the writer's legacy in Brazilian literature, featuring original furniture and memorabilia in its permanent exhibition.

Mário de Andrade's personal belongings on display at Casa Mário de Andrade

Many other independent cultural centers, art galleries, libraries and museums are also found in the district.

SE Palmeiras's training center is situated near Nubank Parque. São Paulo FC's Frederico Antônio Germano Menzen Training Center (SuperCT), inaugurated in 1988, is also located in Barra Funda.

The district has been portrayed in literary works, such as in the writings of Ignácio de Loyola Brandão, and Antônio Castilho de Alcântara Machado's Brás, Bexiga e Barra Funda. Singer and composer Adoniran Barbosa might also have drawn inspiration from the immigrant and lower-class communities in Barra Funda and its surroundings.
