= Baidauli (India) =

Baidauli बैदौली
- Village development committee
- Location in Uttar Pradesh Baidauli (India) Baidauli (Asia)
- Coordinates: 26.97199°N 82.33990°E
- Country: India
- Block: Chhapaiya
- Tehsil: Manakpur
- District: Gonda
- State: Uttar Pradesh

Government
  - Type: Panchayati Raj
  - Gram Pradhan: Kamala Devi

Population (2011)
  - Total: 1,189
- Time zone: UTC+5:30 (India Time)
- PIN: 271305
- Telephone code: 05265
- Vehicle registration: UP 43
- Sex ratio: 591/598♂/♀

Baidauli is a village development committee in India situated in the Mankapur (Assembly constituency) Tehsil of Gonda district in Uttar Pradesh.
