= Norfolk Rural Community Council =

Charity in Norfolk, England

Norfolk Rural Community is a charity that operates in the county of Norfolk, England. Its aim is "to support and work with rural communities through active partnerships to sustain and improve the quality of life for the people of Norfolk."

It is a member of the Action with Communities in Rural England network of 38 Rural Community Councils in England.

The idea of setting up a Rural Community Council in Norfolk was first discussed in 1945. Norfolk RCC was formally inaugurated on 4 November 1986 at a conference in the Memorial Hall in Dereham.

Originally based in offices in Hingham, by 1988 Norfolk RCC had 39 Voluntary Organisations, 70 Parish Councils and 6 individuals in membership. Norfolk RCC supported a diverse range of projects these included an early 'Telecottage' in Sheringham (1995), Affordable Housing (various), community shops (earliest is Earsham in 1994), Village halls (various) and at least one Parish quilt (Tuttington, 1991).

2004 saw the move to new offices in Dereham and by 2005 membership stood at 68 Voluntary Organisations, 253 Parish Councils and 17 individuals. By 2014 Norfolk RCC had around 500 members.

On 1 April 2015 Norfolk Rural Community Council merged with West Norfolk Voluntary Community Action. The form of the merger was the transfer of staff, assets and contacts from West Norfolk Voluntary Community Action to Norfolk Rural Community Council. The organisation then changed its name to Community Action Norfolk.
