= Town council =

Form of local government for small municipalities

A town council, city council or municipal council is a form of local government generally found in small to medium-sized municipalities or districts. The exact usage of these terms varies across different jurisdictions.

== Belize ==
There are currently seven town councils in Belize. Each town council consists of a mayor and a number of councillors, who are directly elected in municipal elections every three years. Town councils in Belize are responsible for a range of functions, including street maintenance and lighting, drainage, refuse collection, public cemeteries, infrastructure, parks and playgrounds.

== Canada ==
=== Ontario ===
Township councils in Ontario play a similar role as city councils in cities for smaller or low tier municipalities. Directly elected every four years, the number of councillors vary depending on the size of their municipalities. The councillors powers and responsibilities are governed by the Municipal Act.

=== Manitoba ===
Manitoba town council members serve primarily as a policy and direction board for the community. They consist of five to seven members with the head of council being the mayor or reeve.

== Ireland ==
In 2002, 49 urban district councils and 26 town commissioners were redesignated as 75 town councils as a tier of local government below the county council. Five additional local authorities retained the higher status as borough councils. All 80 second-tier municipal authorities were abolished under the Local Government Reform Act 2014, with effect at the 2014 Irish local elections.

== England and Wales ==
In England, since the Local Government Act 1972, "town council" is the specific name for a civil parish council which has declared itself by resolution to be a town council. If another type of local council, such as a district authority, covers a single town (such as Luton or Stevenage) then the council is often a 'borough council': borough status is however conferred at the discretion of the Crown.

Civil parishes are the most local level in the local government system. The higher levels are district, unitary and county. However town councils are not subordinate in democratic accountability to those higher levels, but to the electorate of their civil parish area.

The chair of a town council is entitled to be styled as "town mayor". This term contrasts with simply "mayor", which means the mayor of a borough or a city. However, this is often abbreviated simply to mayor, especially where the town was historically a borough or city, such as Lewes or Ely. In Scotland, the term 'provost' is commonly used to designate the leader of the town council.

Historically the term 'town council' was used for the governing body of a municipal borough until the 1972 act.

In Wales, where the lowest tier of local government is known as a community, the community council may unilaterally declare itself to be a town council, but this has the same status as a community council.

== Palestine ==
The Palestinian Authority (PA) established village councils to serve as local administrations and service providers for Palestinian villages and small towns. Village councils are also referred to as D-level municipalities.

== Singapore ==
In Singapore, town councils are responsible for managing and maintaining the common areas of public housing estates by the Housing and Development Board (HDB). Their duties include the miscellaneous upkeep of corridors, void decks, lifts, water tanks, external lighting and open spaces around the estates. Town councils operate under the framework of the Town Councils Act (Cap. 329A, 2000 Rev. Ed.).

The rationale was to delegate estate management duties to Members of Parliament (MPs) alongside their national responsibilities. This arrangement was intended to provide MPs with management experience, increase their accountability and strengthen their familiarity with residents at the local level.

Town council boundaries are based on electoral districts. A town council may cover a group representation constituency (GRC), a single member constituency (SMC) or a combination of neighbouring GRCs and SMCs held by the same political party. Each town council is headed by the MPs of its constituencies, supported by an appointed board. These boundaries do not align with planning areas, which are used for urban planning. As a result, different parts of the same HDB town or planning area may fall under different town councils.

== United States ==
=== Indiana ===
Indiana town council members serve as both the executive and legislative branches for small communities incorporated as towns within the state. They consist of three or five members, depending upon the town's population.

Unlike some states, Indiana councilmembers must declare a political party affiliation, if any, when they file to run for office. Upon election in November, they are sworn in before 1 January of the following year, where they serve a four-year term. There are no state term limits affecting how many times a candidate may run for re-election to office.

The first meeting after an election, members of the town council hold an organising meeting, where they elect a president to set future agendas and act as an official spokesman for the town or as liaison between the town and state and county government.

Indiana town councils work in conjunction with an elected town clerk, who manages the day-to-day business of the municipal government. As an elected official, the town clerk is solely executive in function and operates independently of the town council. But the council has final say on budgets which clerks depend upon to operate.

In addition to a clerk, the council can authorise the hiring of other staff to run the operations of government, including law enforcement officers, utility workers, park and recreation employees and town managers. These employees serve at the pleasure of the council.

=== Massachusetts ===
Town councils in Massachusetts are essentially city councils in towns which have adopted a city form of government but prefer to retain the "town of" in their names. In several communities which have adopted such a government, the official name of the community is "The City known as the Town of..." The legislative body of a legal town in Massachusetts is a town meeting; the executive board is a board of selectmen. In addition to having the structure of a city with a mayor and council, cities in Massachusetts can enact ordinances, while towns may adopt by-laws, which are subject to the approval of the attorney general. City ordinances are presumed to be legal unless challenged and set aside in court. See Massachusetts government.

=== Michigan ===
In Michigan, there are 264 incorporated villages that are governed by village councils, which is a form of weak–mayor administration. Michigan does not use "town" as a defined municipality, and villages are the lowest-level form of incorporated municipality. Villages are distinct from cities in that they share certain duties with their surrounding township and are not completely autonomous. Guidelines for village governments are defined in the General Law Village Act (Act 3) of 1895. Village councils consist of elected officials, including a village president, trustees, clerk, and treasurer.

=== New Hampshire ===
In New Hampshire, the Town Council is an elected body which serves as the legislative and executive body of the town. The town is governed by a charter, which is allowed under the home rule provision of the New Hampshire Constitution (Pt I, Art. 39) and Title III of the New Hampshire Revised Statutes Annotated. The charter for a Town Council must meet the following requirements of RSA 49-D:3 I. (a) – (e) and all other applicable laws. The basic notion of home rule in New Hampshire is that local communities are not allowed to supersede the authority specifically granted to them by the state.

==== Official Ballot Town Council ====
The Official Ballot Town Council is a variant form of the Town Council. In the Official Ballot form of government, the town council is vested with the limited authority to vote on all matters not voted on by official ballot. The authority and restrictions on the Official Ballot town council is the same as the Town Council, except with respect to those matters specified to be voted on by official ballot. Also, the council decides what is placed on the ballot, not the registered voters.

The charter of the Official Ballot Town Council is required by law to specify specifically:

- Which budgetary items to be included on the official ballot; and
- A finalisation process for the annual budget; and
- Process for public hearings, debate, discussion and amendment of questions to be placed on the official ballot; and
- Procedures for the transfer of funds among various departments, funds, accounts and agencies as may be necessary during the year; and
- Applicability of the official ballot procedure to special elections

The charter also must specify whether a 2/3 or 3/5 majority vote is required to approve bonds or notes, with the default being 2/3.

== Others ==
- Community council, the lowest tier of local government in England, Scotland and Wales
- Rural Council, a former name for Sangguniang Barangay, Philippines
- Rural community council, Great Britain
- Selsoviet, lowest level of administrative division in rural areas in the Soviet Union, preserved as a third tier of administrative-territorial division throughout Ukraine, Belarus and some parts of Russia
- Rural Council (Ukraine)
- Rural municipality (Nepal) (Gaunpalika)
- Nagar panchayat, India

== See also ==
- Municipal council
- Local election
