= Village development committee (Nepal) =

Former lower administrative part of Nepal's local development ministry

A village development committee (Nepali: गाउँ विकास समिति; gāum̐ vikās samiti) in Nepal was the lower administrative part of its Ministry of Federal Affairs and Local Development. Each district had several VDCs, similar to municipalities but with greater public-government interaction and administration. There were 3,157 village development committees in Nepal. Each village development committee was further divided into several wards (Nepali: वडा) depending on the population of the district, the average being nine wards.

== Purpose ==
The purpose of village development committees is to organise the village people structurally at a local level and creating a partnership between the community and the public sector for improved service delivery system. A village development committee has the status of an autonomous institution and the authority to interact with the more centralised institutions of governance in Nepal. In doing so, the village development committee gives the village people an element of control and responsibility in development, and also ensures proper utilization, distribution of state funds and a greater interaction between government officials, NGOs and agencies. The village development committees within a given area discuss education, water supply, basic health, sanitation and income and also monitor and record progress which is displayed in census data.

== Organization ==
In a village development committee, there was one elected chief, usually elected with an over 80% majority. A chief was elected from each ward. With these, there were four members elected or nominated. To keep data and records, and to manage administrative work, there was one village secretary. The position was a permanent appointment by the government, from whom they received a salary. The ward members, ward chief, and VDC chiefs were not paid a salary, but they obtained money according to their presence. VDCs were guided by the district development committee, headquarters, and the chief of DDC was a local development officer (LDO). Population and housing details of VDCs in Nepal were provided by the National Population and Housing Census, in 1991, 2001 and 2011.

== Dissolution ==
The village development committee structure was dissolved on 10 March 2017 to be replaced by gaunpalika. Previously, the Panchayat was dissolved and turned into village development committees by the constitution of Nepal in 1990.

=== Wards and electoral divisions of Nepal ===
Previous village development committees were either merged with existing municipalities or combined to create a new rural council. Most village development committees were turned into wards of new or existing municipalities without any changes, some were split and created two wards, and others were split in many pieces and merged into other village development committees to create new wards in different municipalities.

== See also ==
- Land-use planning
- List of village development committees of Nepal
- Palakot wodapalika (पालाकोट वडापालिका)
- Rural community council, England
- Village development committee (India)
