= R160 (New York City Subway car) =

Class of New York City Subway car

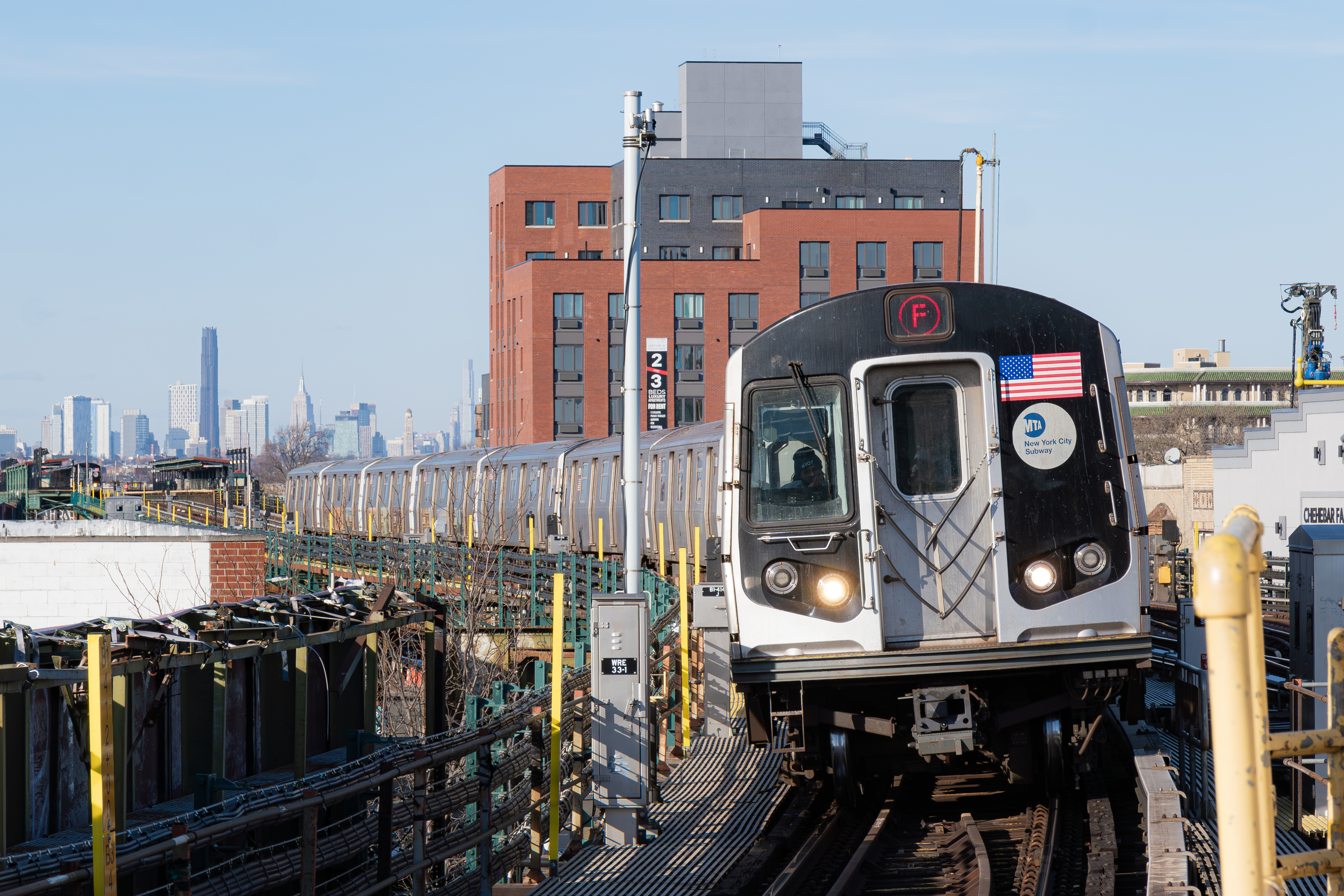
- An R160 train on the F approaching Kings Highway

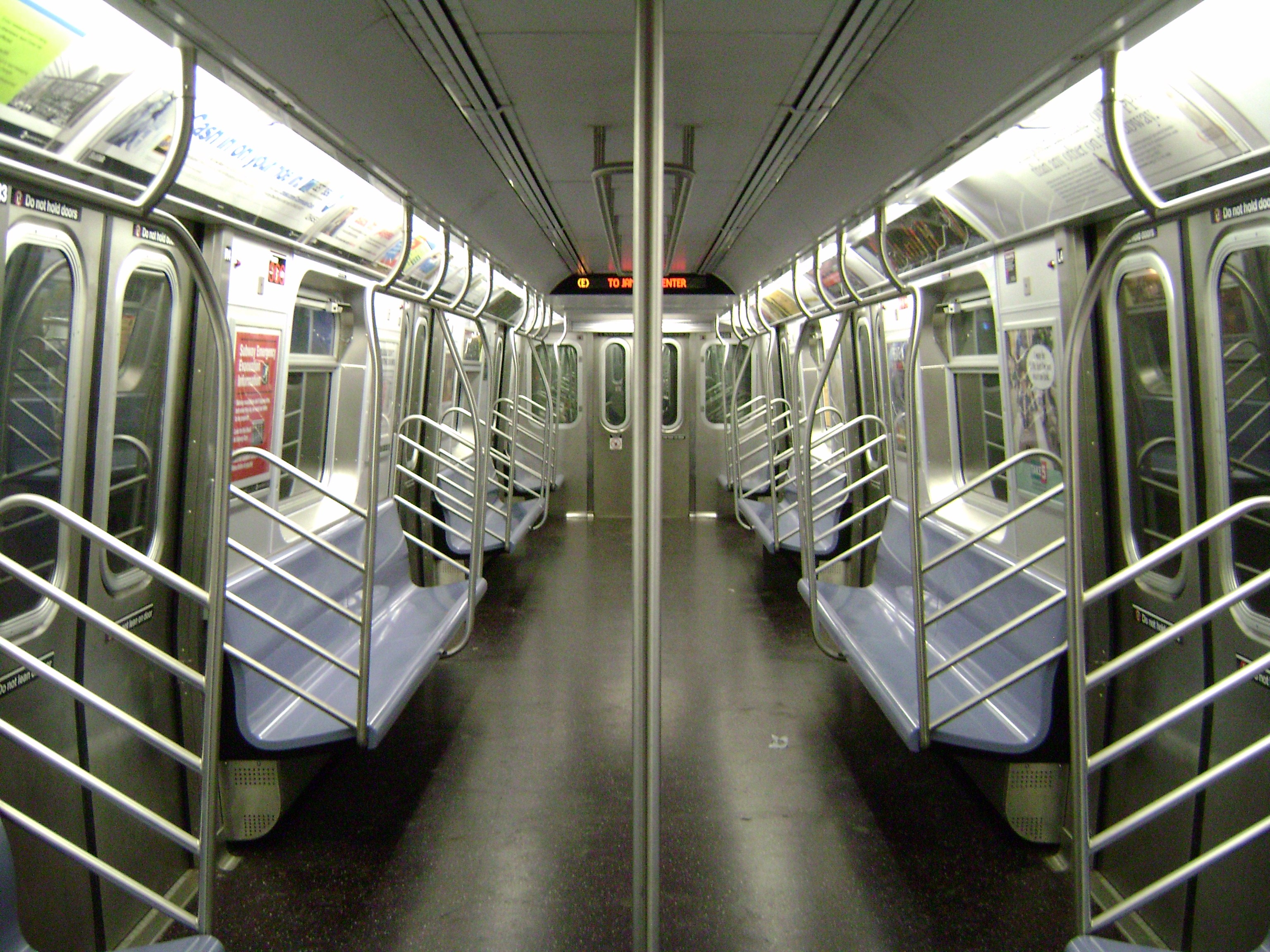
- Interior of an R160 car, prior to refurbishments
- In service: August 17, 2006 – present (20 years)
- Manufacturers: Alstom (R160A); Kawasaki Rail Car Company (R160B)
- Built at: Alstom: Lapa, São Paulo, Brazil (final assembly: Hornell, New York, US); Kawasaki: Kobe, Hyōgo, Japan; Lincoln, Nebraska, US (final assembly: Yonkers, New York, US)
- Family name: New Technology Train
- Replaced: Most R32s and R42s; All R38s, R40s, and NYCT R44s
- Constructed: 2005–2010
- Entered service: R160A: October 17, 2006; R160B: August 17, 2006
- Refurbished: 2017–present
- Number built: R160A: 1,002; R160B: 660; Total: 1,662
- Number in service: 1,662
- Formation: 93 four-car sets (two B cars); 258 five-car sets (three B cars)
- Fleet numbers: R160A (four-car sets): 8313–8652; 9943–9974; R160A (five-car sets): 8653–8712; 9233–9802; R160B: 8713–9232; 9803–9942
- Capacity: 42 seating, 198 standing (A car); 44 seating, 202 standing (B car)
- Operator: New York City Subway
- Depots: East New York Yard (372 cars); Jamaica Yard (1290 cars)
- Services assigned: R160 (four-car sets): (Updated June 30, 2024); R160 (five-car sets): (1 train is also used in Q service during morning rush, but is shown in the R assignment) (Updated June 30, 2024)

Specifications
- Car body construction: Stainless steel with fiberglass ends and rear bonnets
- Train length: 4-car train: 240 ft 10.08 in (73.4080 m); 5-car train: 301 ft 0.6 in (91.760 m); 8-car train (two 4-car sets): 481 ft 8.16 in (146.8161 m); 10-car train (two 5-car sets): 602 ft 1.2 in (183.520 m)
- Car length: 60 ft 2.52 in (18,352.0 mm)
- Width: 9 ft 9.28 in (2,979 mm)
- Height: 12 ft 0.29 in (3,665 mm)
- Floor height: 3 ft 9.12 in (1,146.0 mm)
- Platform height: 3 ft 9.12 in (1,146.0 mm)
- Entry: Level
- Doors: 8 sets of 50-in-wide side doors per car
- Maximum speed: 55 mph (89 km/h)
- Weight: 85,200 lb (38,600 kg)
- Traction system: Alstom ONIX 800 or Siemens G600 D400/370 M5-1 (Note: 8843–9102 only) IGBT–VVVF
- Traction motors: 4 × 3-phase AC induction motor Alstom 4 LCA 1640 147.5 hp (110 kW); Siemens 1TB1710-1GA02 161 hp (120 kW)
- Acceleration: 2.5 mph/s (4.0 km/(h⋅s))
- Deceleration: 3.0 mph/s (4.8 km/(h⋅s)) (full service); 3.2 mph/s (5.1 km/(h⋅s)) (emergency)
- Auxiliaries: SAFT 250AH battery (B car)
- Electric systems: Third rail, 625 V DC
- Current collection: Contact shoe
- UIC classification: Bo′Bo′ (Note: This pertains to one carriage.)
- AAR wheel arrangement: B-B
- Braking systems: Dynamic braking propulsion system; WABCO RT96 tread brake system
- Safety systems: CBTC; Dead man's switch; Tripcock
- Headlight type: halogen light bulb
- Track gauge: 4 ft 8 1/2 in (1,435 mm) standard gauge

The R160 is a class of New Technology Train subway cars built for the New York City Subway's B Division. Entering service between 2006 and 2010, they replaced all R38, R40, and NYCT-operated R44 cars, and most R32 and R42 cars. The R160s are very similar to the earlier R143s and later R179s. The biggest difference between the R160 and R143 is the Flexible Information and Notice Display (FIND) system on the R160s in place of static LED maps on the R143s and all A-Division New Technology fleet. As of 2025, the R160 is the most numerous subway car on the New York City subway system.

In total, 1,662 cars comprise the R160 class, which consists of two models, the 1,002 Alstom-built R160A cars and the 660 Kawasaki-built R160B cars. The R160A cars are organized in two different configurations, with 372 cars arranged in four-car sets and 630 cars arranged in five-car sets. All R160B cars are in five-car sets, but are subdivided by which propulsion system they use; the majority use the Alstom ONIX propulsion system also found on the R160A cars, while cars 8843–9102 use Siemens propulsion.

Kawasaki had little to no problems in delivering the R160B cars, which entered service on August 17, 2006. Alstom was behind the delivery schedule early on for the R160As, which first ran on October 17, 2006. The Metropolitan Transportation Authority exercised options for both contracts, and by June 2010, all R160 cars were in service. Numerous experimental features were added to the R160s through the 2010s. 64 R160A cars were fitted with communications-based train control (CBTC) equipment installed for service on the Canarsie Line (L train), while the rest of the remaining fleet has CBTC equipment installed for service on the Queens Boulevard Line (E, F, M, and R trains).

== Description ==
There are two versions of the R160: the R160A (built by Alstom, numbered 8313–8712, 9233–9802, & 9943–9974) and the R160B (built by Kawasaki, numbered 8713–9232 & 9803–9942). The two car types differ only in a few ways; both can interoperate with each other. The R160As and the majority of the R160Bs utilize the same traction motors as the R142s, while the rest of the R160Bs utilize traction motors similar to those tested on R143s 8205–8212. Both versions of the R160s are very similar to the R143s and R179s, but the three car types are not interoperable with each other due to electrical incompatibilities between them.

The R160 cars are configured in either four-car sets or five-car sets. 372 R160A cars (8313–8652 & 9943–9974) are configured as four-car sets and assigned to East New York Yard for the BMT Eastern Division; all four-car sets run on the J, M, and Z, but sets 8313–8376 are able to run on the L alongside that route's fleet of R143s. The remaining 630 R160A cars as well as all R160Bs are configured as five-car sets, assigned to Jamaica Yard and run on the E, F, and R.

The R160A base order was part of a $961,687,121 contract funded in part by a grant from the Federal Transit Administration. The primary base order of the R160 class consisted of 660 cars, 400 R160As to be built by Alstom, and the remaining 260 R160Bs to be built by Kawasaki. The contract included options for further orders, which, if exercised, would have brought the total business with NYCT to about US$2.4 billion, for 1,700 subway cars, and Kawasaki would have manufactured 40% (680 cars) of the 1,700 cars. The R160 fleet was purchased at an average cost of $2.0 million USD per car.

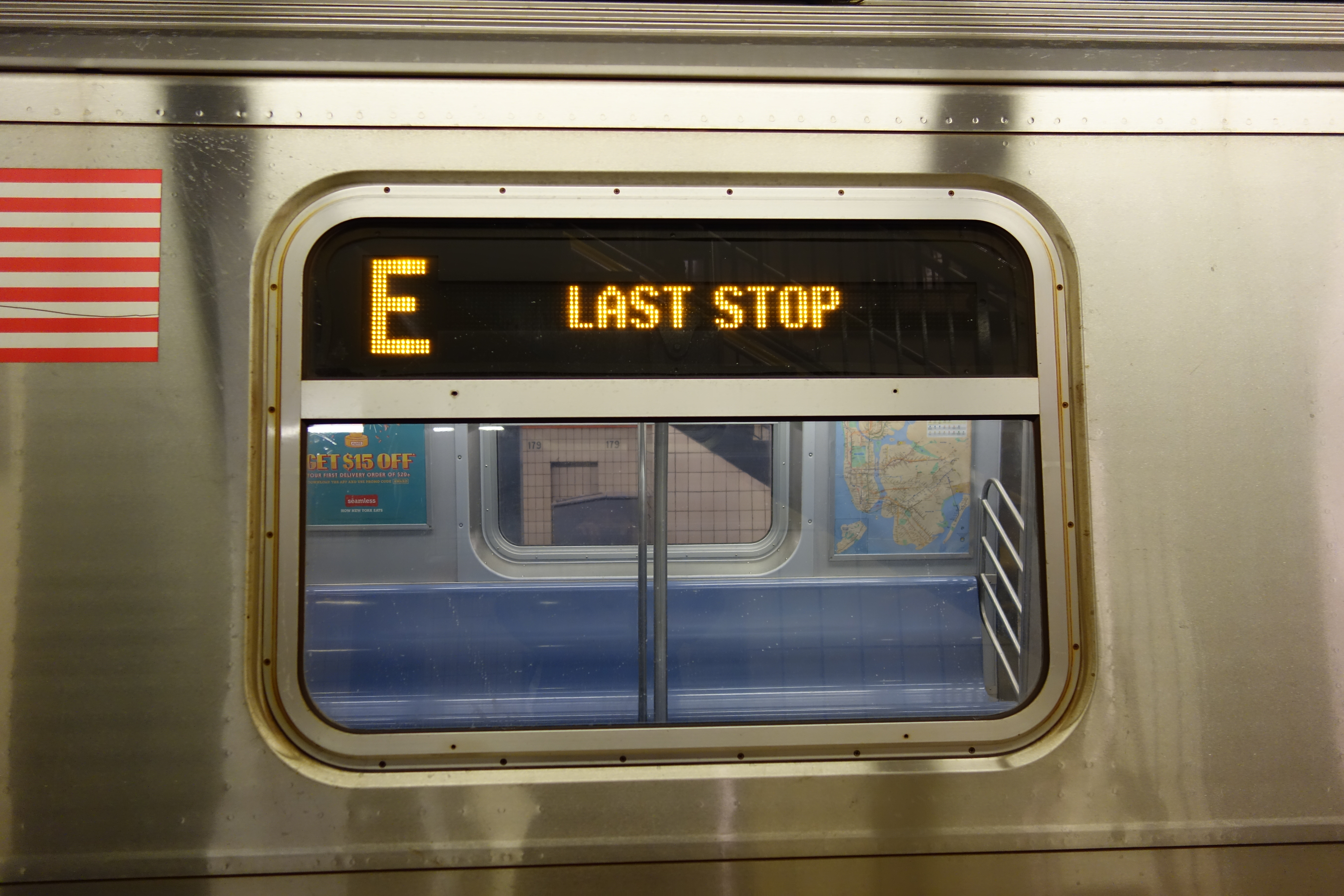
The LED side destination sign of an R160 car

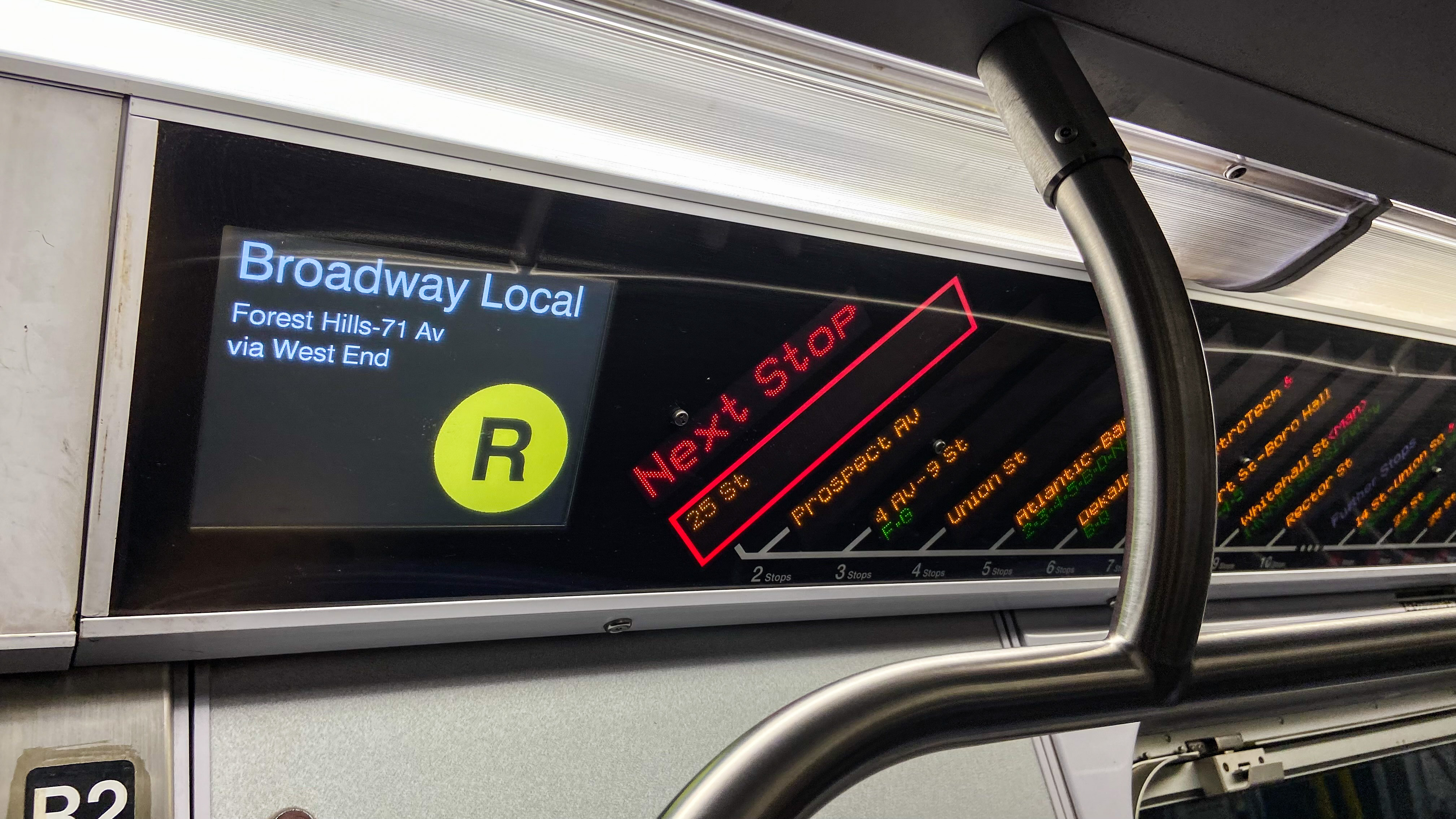
The R160 FIND display

== Features ==
The R160s are equipped with regenerative braking, which allows the cars to capture the braking energy as trains enter a station and transfer it to trains on nearby tracks.

One of the major changes and highlights of the new cars is the addition of an electronic "FIND" (Flexible Information and Notice Display) system, which includes an LCD screen displaying the route, route information, and advertisements, and a tri-color (red, yellow, green) LED strip map which displays the next ten stations, plus five consecutive "further stops" to riders. There are three of these in every car. The display updates the stations at every stop, also giving the number of stops to each station listed. The FIND system replaces a plastic card that had a set route and stations printed on, which was used on the R142, R142A, R143, and R188 subway cars, each of which has 64 amber LED dot station indicators. This allows for instant route or line changes with the correct information, which includes, but is not limited to, the omitting of certain stops.

=== Other features ===
As part of a 2010 pilot program to increase security and capacity, R160B cars 8713–8722 tested folding seats, CCTV, pivoted grabhandles, and looped stanchions. Following passenger complaints and Kawasaki's refusal to test the same equipment on a set of R142 cars, the program was canceled in 2012 and the equipment was removed. Some of the remaining grabhandles and folding seats from the program have been reused to address a state of emergency in 2017, but have been the subject of vandalism.

In 2016, a non-advertised pilot program saw 20 R160 sets based out of Jamaica Yard testing onboard WiFi. That same year, many cars had their Arts for Transit boards replaced with LCD information screens to display public safety announcements, advertisements, and trivia. These screens are similar to the ones onboard all R143 cars; however, they can display a range of colors instead of just red, orange, and green.

In 2018, R160A car 8395 had its truck suspension system replaced with carbon fiber reinforced plastic "efWING" leaf springs from Kawasaki, to determine the feasibility of them replacing the heavier coil spring suspension found on all other R160s. R160B car 9116 was also equipped with the new suspension. (Note: See also:* DJ Hammers (March 24, 2018), R160 efWING Truck Test Train at Euclid Avenue, archived from the original on December 21, 2021)

In September 2020, a set of R160s received digital display advertising as a pilot test. This is similar to the digital advertising found on R188 cars 7847–7848. Multiple R160s have since had these screens installed in place of the paper advertisements.

The R160 cars began to receive CCTV security cameras in mid-2022 as part of a program to combat the rise of vandalism within the subway system.

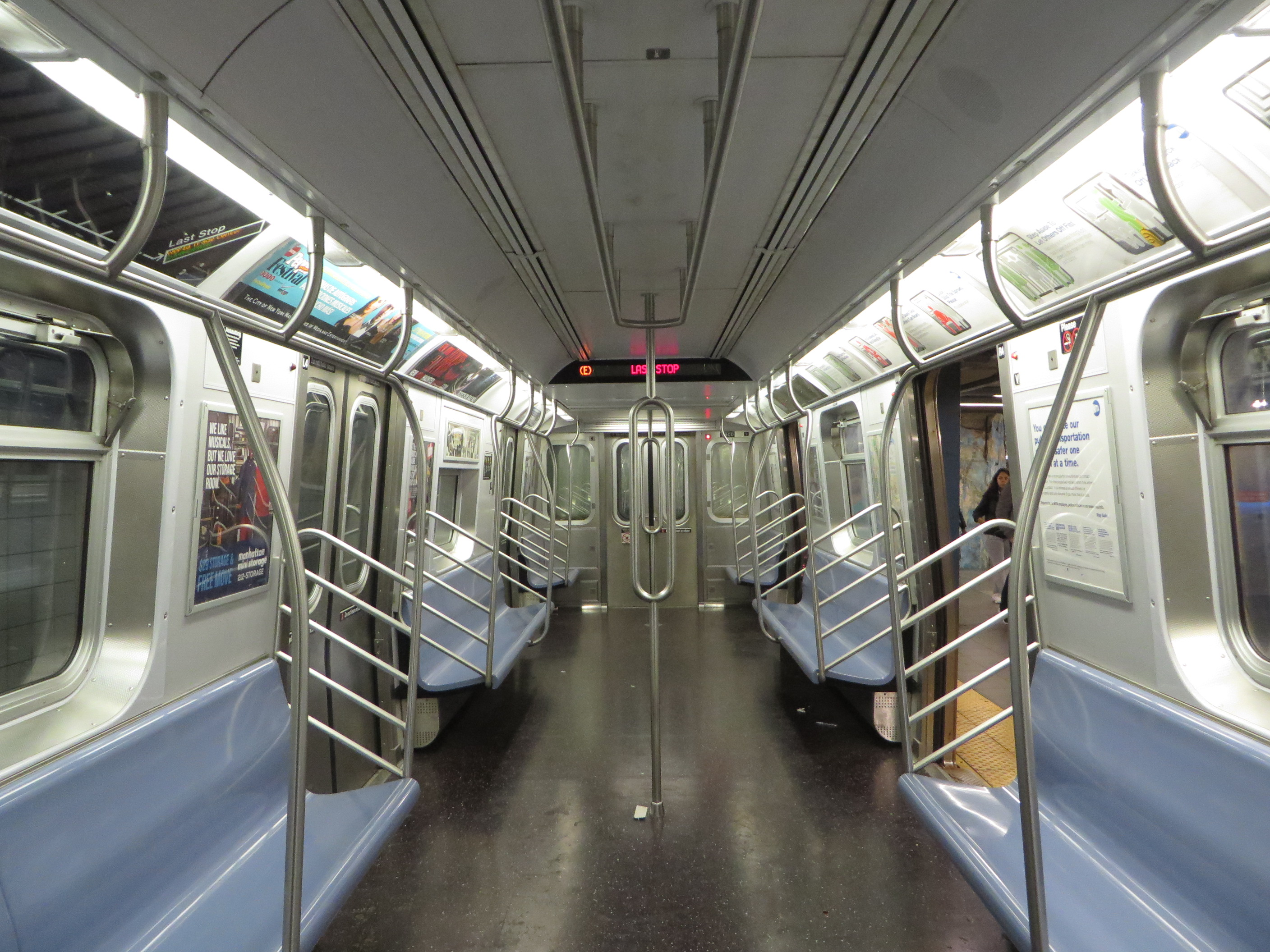
The interior of R160 car 9800 with experimental looped stanchions

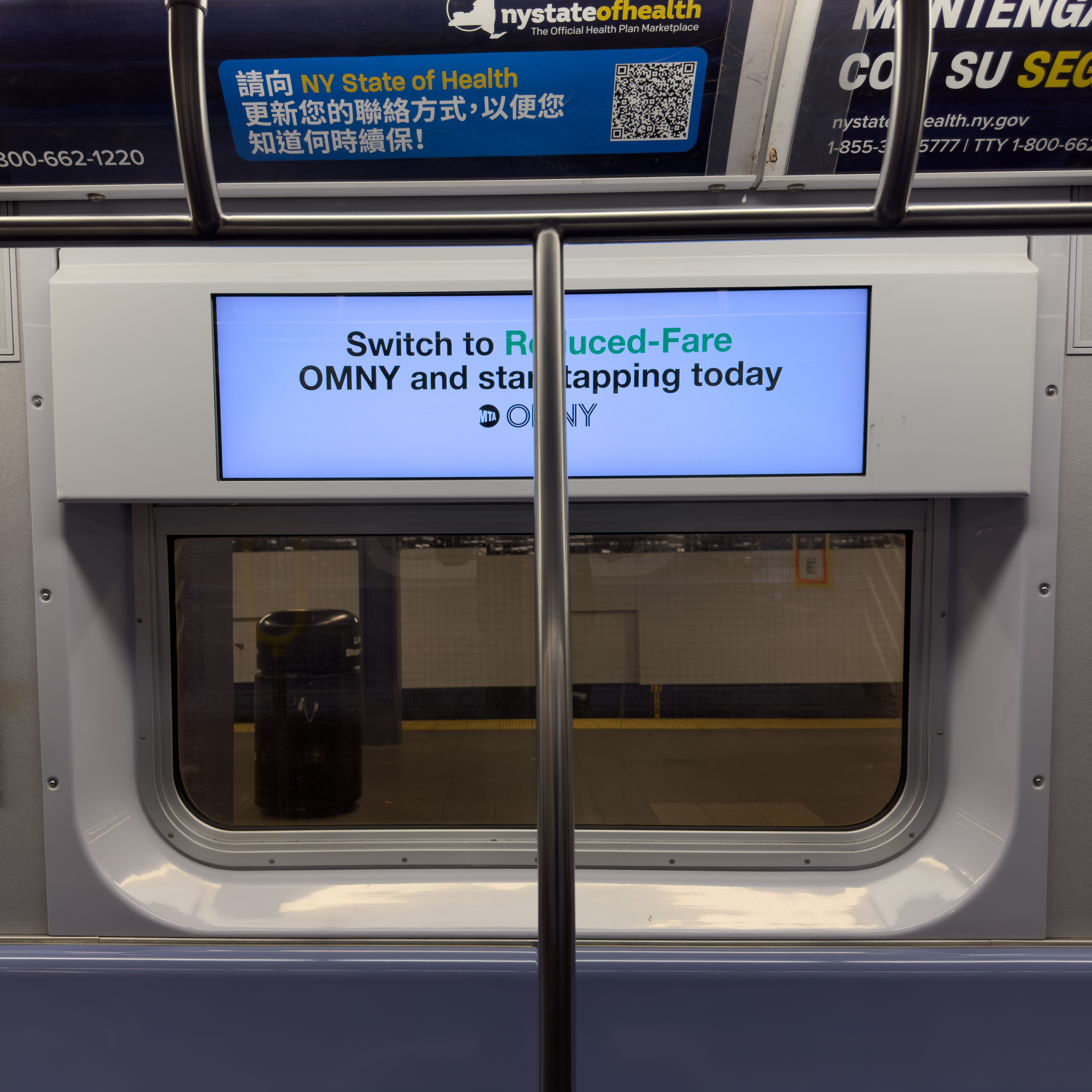
A display LCD information screen on R160 8722

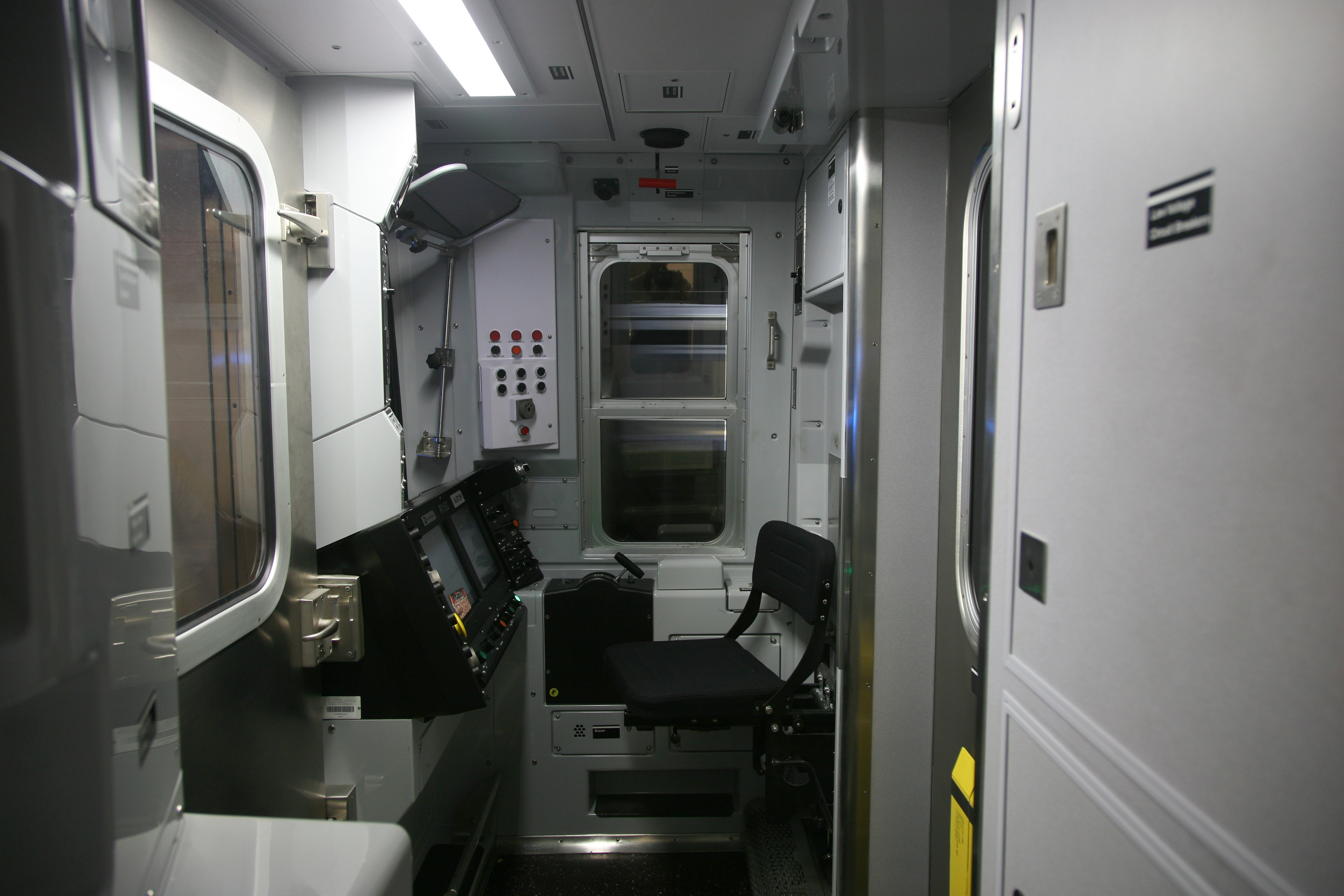
Driver's cab of an R160 train

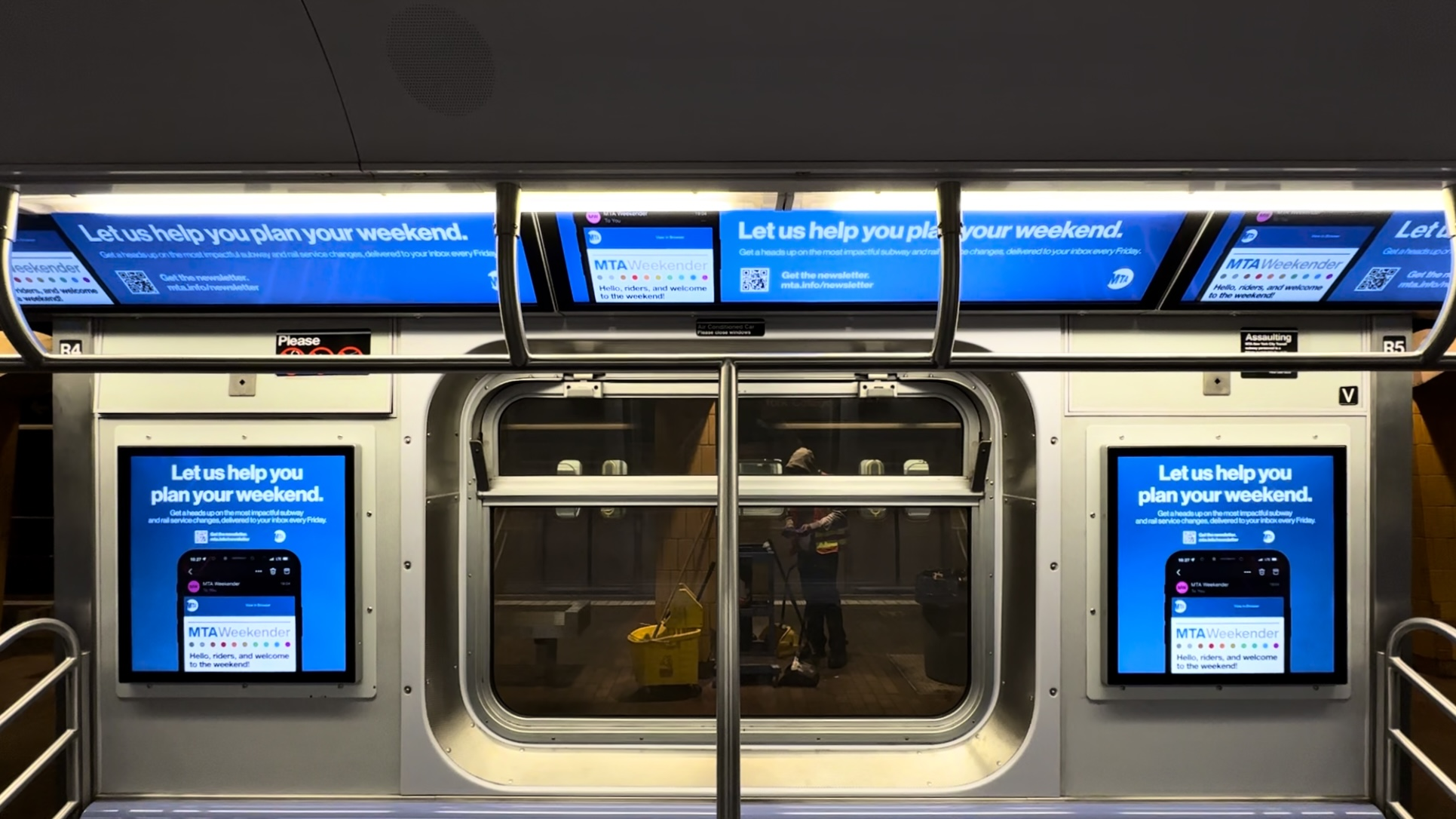
LCD advertisement screens inside an R160

=== Communications-based train control ===
The R160 fleet is equipped with communications-based train control (CBTC). 64 R160As (8313–8376) have CBTC equipment installed for use on the Canarsie Line (L train), alongside already-equipped R143 cars. The CBTC equipment used in the Canarsie Line cars was manufactured by Siemens Transportation Systems. R160As 8313–8316 and 8377–8380 were temporarily taken out of service to test equipment between Bergen Street and Church Avenue on the express tracks of the IND Culver Line, and later returned to service.

An additional 1,486 cars, comprising all 5-car sets and many 4-car sets, have been equipped with CBTC for use on the Queens Boulevard Line (E, F, M, and R trains). The CBTC equipment for the Queens Boulevard Line cars is different from the Canarsie Line CBTC equipment and was manufactured by a joint venture between Siemens and Thales Group. The remaining 4-car sets will be equipped with CBTC for use on the BMT Nassau Street Line.

== History ==
=== Construction ===
On July 31, 2002, it was announced that New York City Transit awarded a $961,687,121 contract to Alstom for 660 new cars, with two new options that could provide for a total of 1,040 cars. Kawasaki and Alstom organized a joint venture called Alskaw Inc. for project management, engineering, and equipment purchasing to pursue the contract, and to allow for operational compatibility with the R143s, which were built by Kawasaki. The two companies built and delivered the rolling stock through the joint venture. Kawasaki not only manufactured 260 cars for the base contract but was also the engineering leader for the whole project and provided the trucks for all cars. Alstom assembled 1002 R160A cars at its manufacturing plant in Hornell, New York, while Kawasaki assembled 660 R160B cars at its plant in Yonkers, New York and Kobe, Hyōgo in Japan. Shells for the Alstom-built cars were built in their Lapa plant, in São Paulo, Brazil, and shells for the Kawasaki-built cars were assembled at their Lincoln, Nebraska plant. The base order consisted of 660 cars, the first option included 620 cars, and the second option included 382 cars.

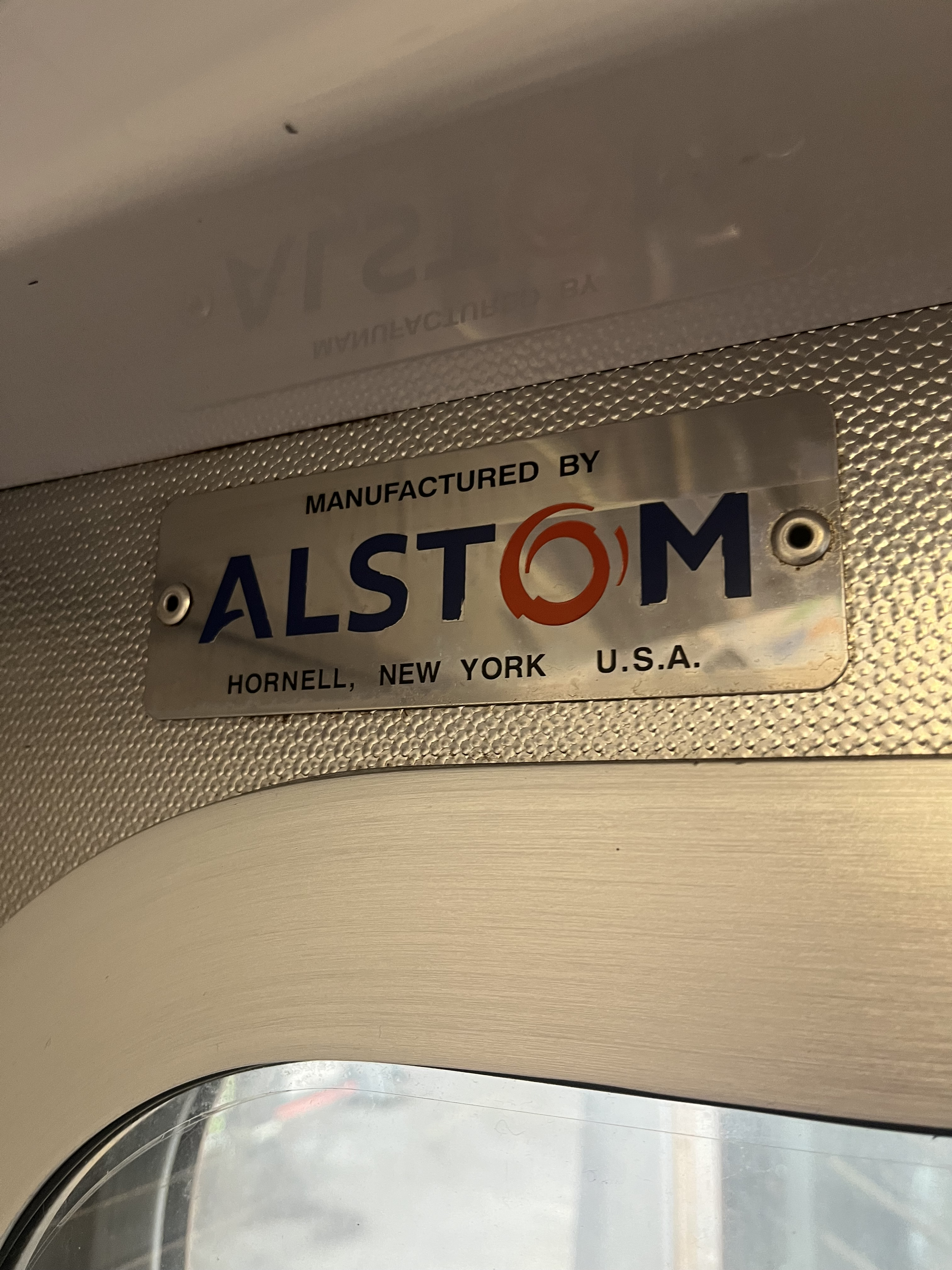
Builders plate seen on all R160As

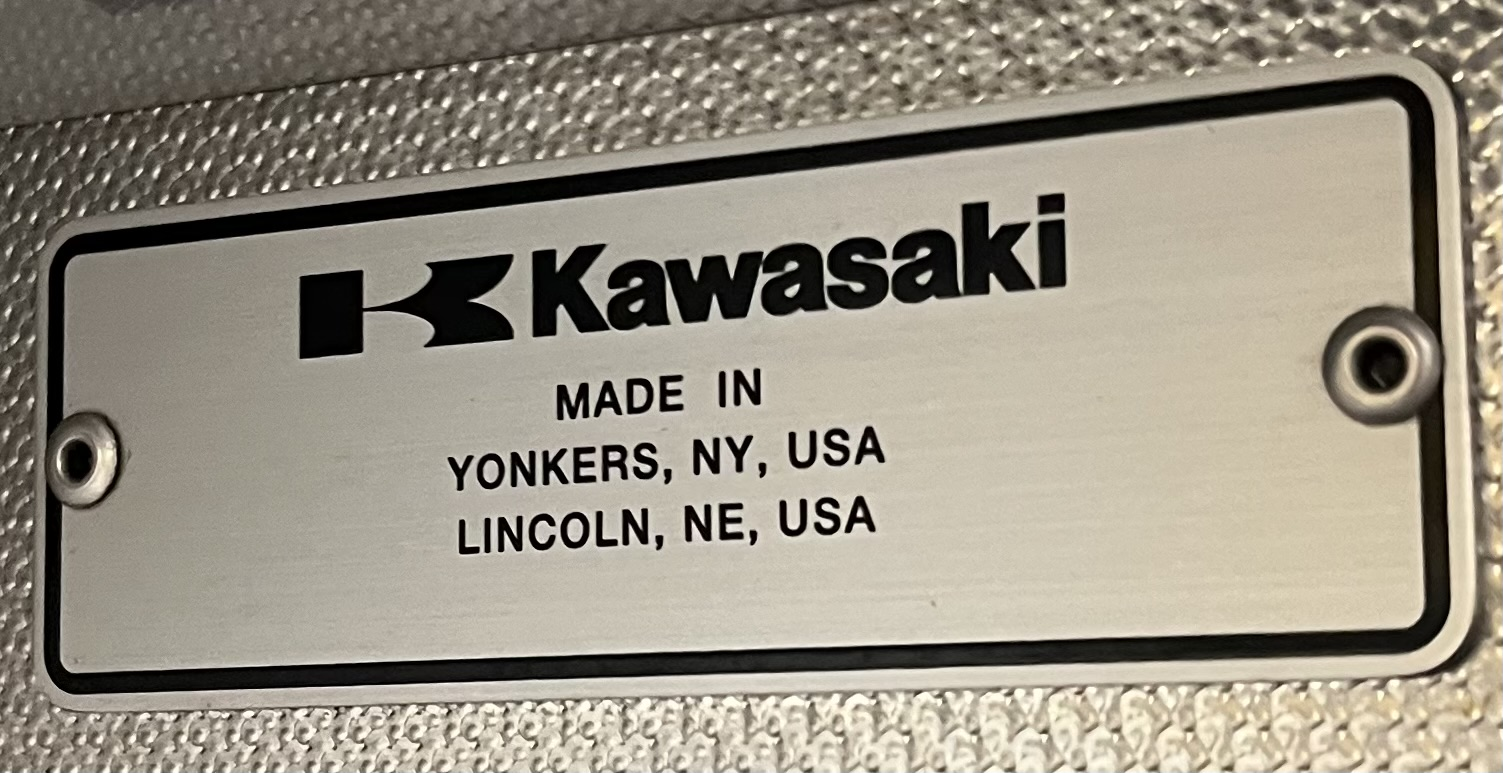
Builders plate seen on all R160Bs

=== Delivery ===
Early on in the order, Alstom encountered significant start-up production problems since being awarded the base contract. In July 2005, Alstom missed its contractual deadline to deliver the 10-car test train, which arrived five months late with Alstom requesting three additional months to deliver the test train. In addition, the Transit Authority rejected several car shells made earlier at their plant in Lapa, Brazil, near São Paulo, after discovering welding defects.

The first 5-car set of R160As (8653–8657) was delivered on November 29, 2005, and the next remaining five cars (8658–8662) were delivered on December 6, 2005, to the New York City Transit Authority, forming a complete 10-car train for acceptance testing and evaluation. The R160As entered revenue service on the A on October 17, 2006, for in-service acceptance testing after several months of exhaustive non-revenue service tests.

The first train of R160Bs (8713–8722) was delivered on July 22, 2005. The R160Bs entered revenue service on the N on August 17, 2006, for in-service acceptance testing after slightly over a year of successful non-revenue service tests.

While Kawasaki had few or no problems in delivering the R160Bs, Alstom was behind on its delivery schedule early on in the R160A order. Alstom was to deliver 200 out of the 400-car base order by September 2007. However, by that month, Alstom had only delivered 80 cars. Under the base contract, Alstom agreed to pay damages of $800 a day for late deliveries of four-car trains, and $1000 a day for five-car trains, though the Transit Authority had not yet fined Alstom for its late deliveries and was actually negotiating with Alstom to accelerate their delivery schedule. The 200 cars were finally delivered 7 months late in early April 2008.

On November 10, 2008, the MTA exercised options for 140 R160B cars (9803–9942) and 242 R160A cars, broken down into 32 cars arranged as 4-car sets (9943–9974) and 210 cars arranged in 5-car sets (9593–9802).

The option order cars were delivered starting in late 2009, and the final cars were delivered on May 6, 2010. By June 2010, all R160A and R160B cars were in revenue service.

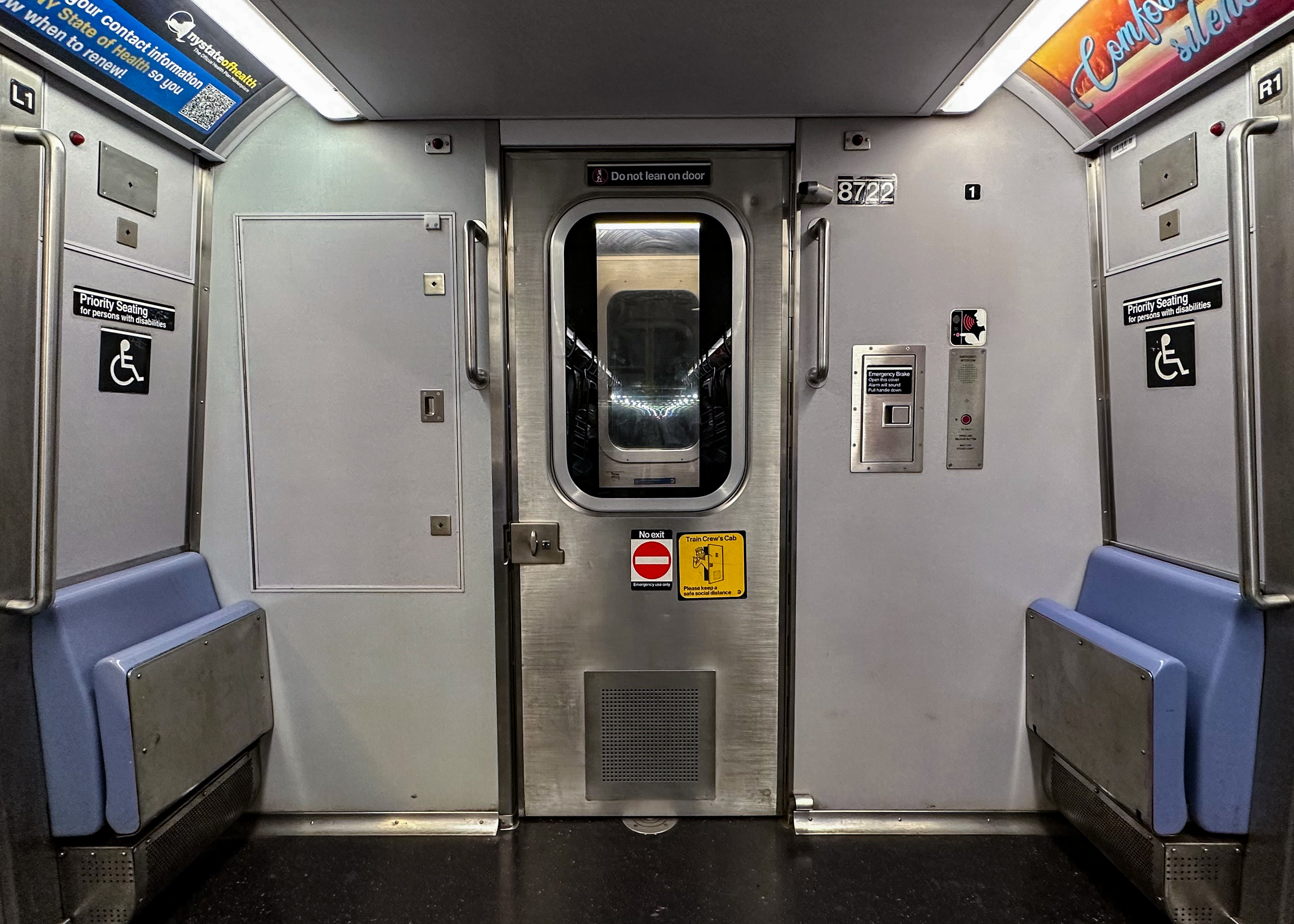
Original melamine panels and flipseats at the #1 end

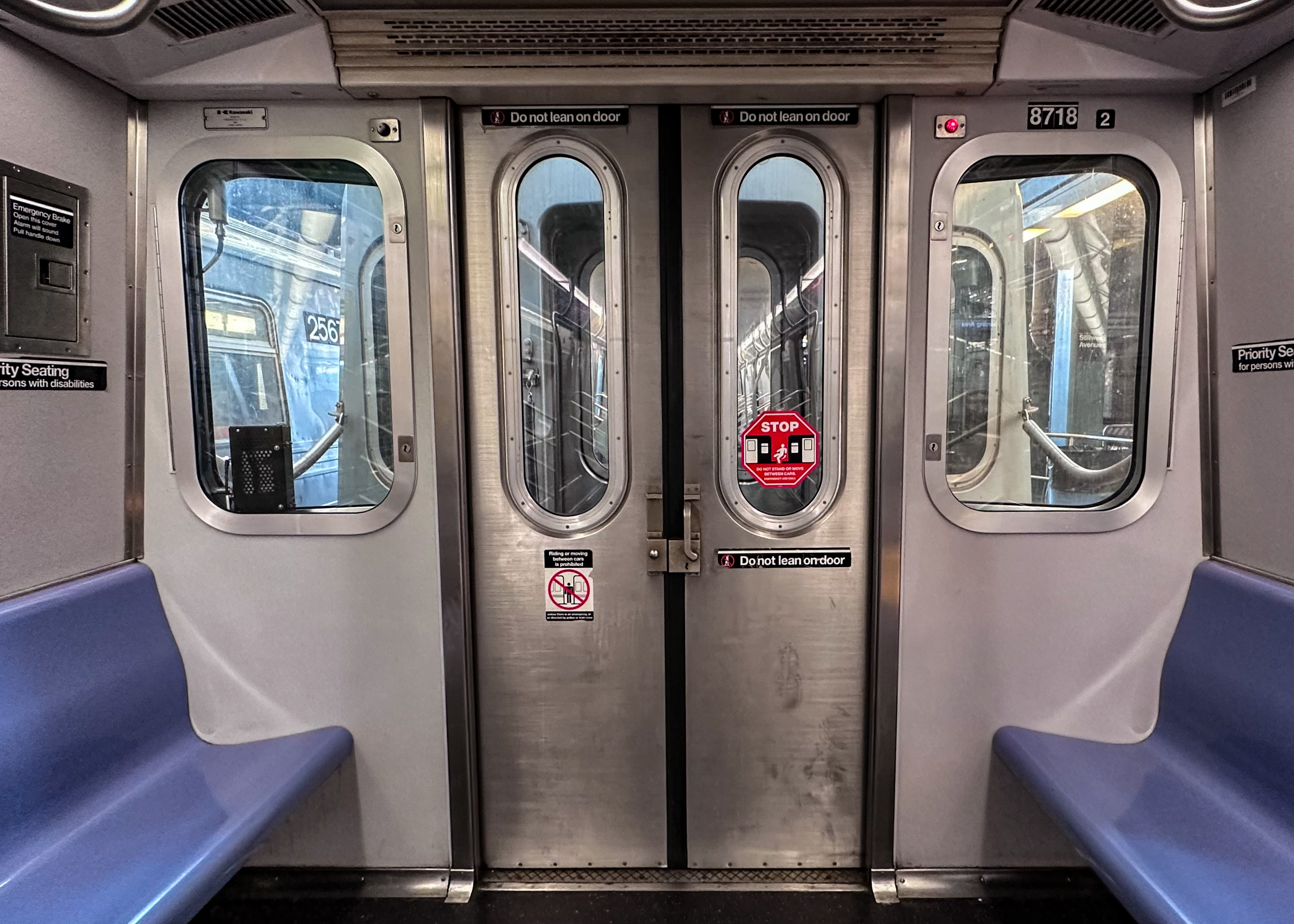
Original melamine panels at the #2 end

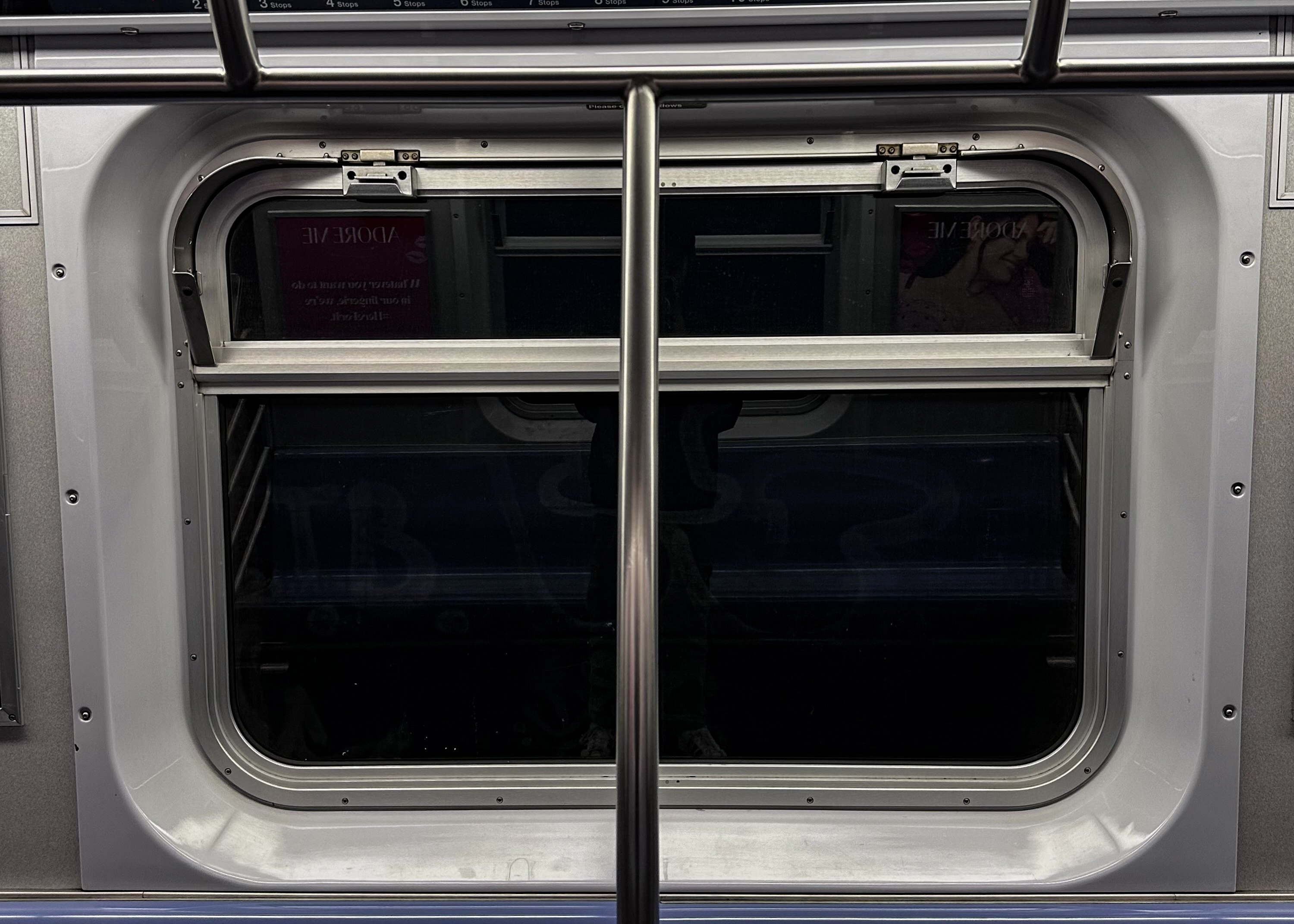
Original flat windowsills

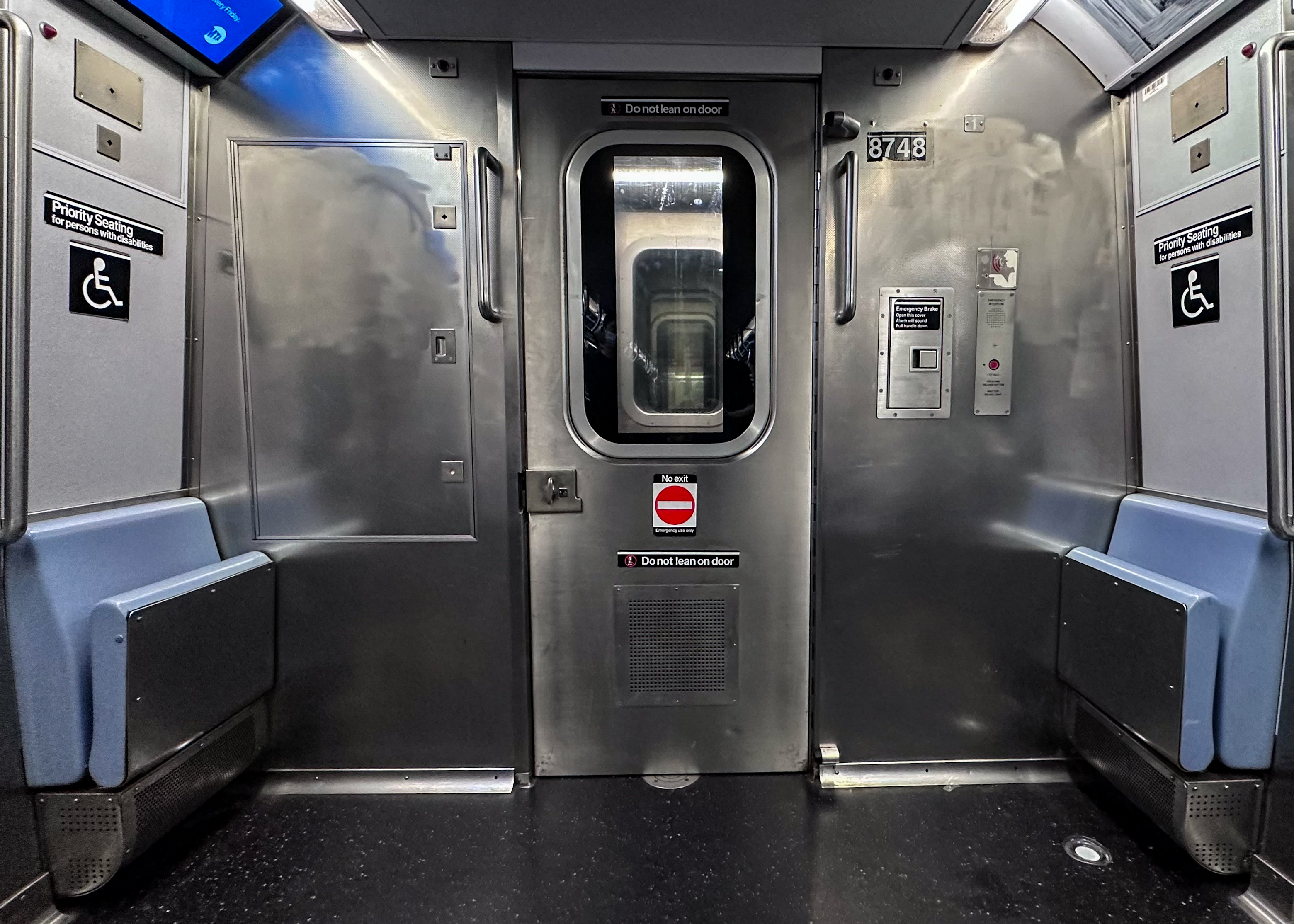
New stainless steel wall with original flipseats at the #1 end

=== Post-delivery incidents and refurbishments ===
After Hurricane Sandy, R160B set 8738–8742 was damaged and required an extensive electrical reconstruction at Coney Island Shops. In March 2016, the set underwent pre-service testing and finally returned to service in fall 2016.

In response to the 2017 New York City transit crisis, the R160s have seen mass refurbishments. A majority of the R160s have been given LED interior lighting, yellow-painted looped stanchions, traffic flow signage, and LCD information screens (that replaced the Arts-for-Transit cards). Some R160s have also been deep-cleaned. Twenty 5-car sets (100 cars) assigned to the E received the same features, but the seats at the end of the cars were removed to increase capacity. To identify these cars, they were given interior artwork and exterior wrapping. Two 4-car sets (8 cars) assigned to the L were later given the same exterior wrapping, LED interior lighting, yellow-painted looped stanchions, traffic flow signage, and LCD information screens (that replaced the Art-for-Transit cards), plus folding seats and pivoted grabhandles previously tested in 2010. Passengers sometimes vandalize the seats when they are locked in the up position during rush hours.

After Hurricane Ida, R160B set 9108–9112 was damaged and required an extensive electrical reconstruction at Coney Island Shops. It was moved to the shops on September 22, 2021. It returned to service almost two years later on July 3, 2023.

In early 2025, a disproportionately high number of R160s running on the E, F, and R developed wheel problems as a result of a track defect along one of these routes. This issue resulted in a shortage of rolling stock that lasted several months; the MTA ultimately bought 3,000 additional sets of wheels, after the R160 wheel replacements exhausted the MTA's supply of spare wheels.

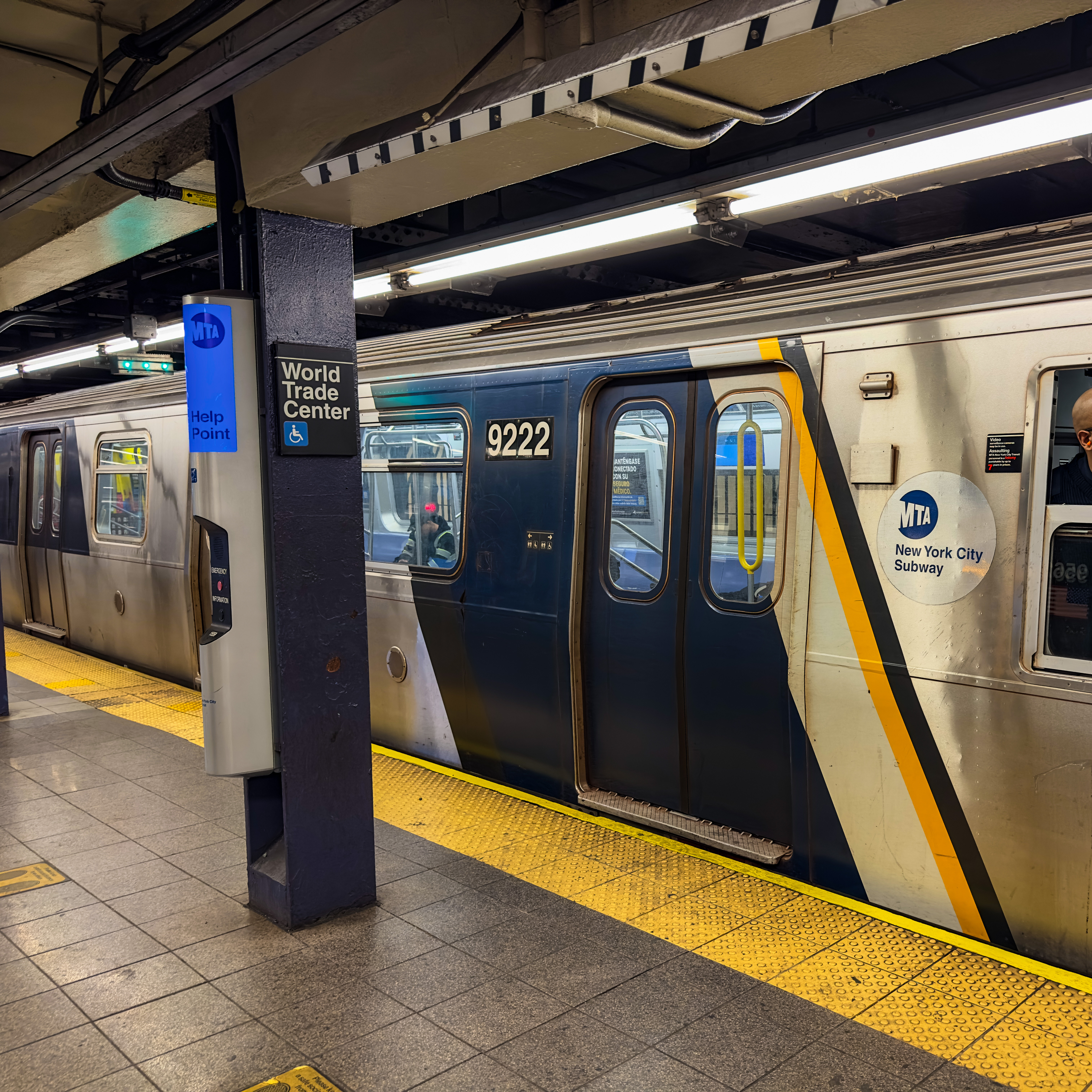
An R160 with Subway Action pilot exterior wrapping

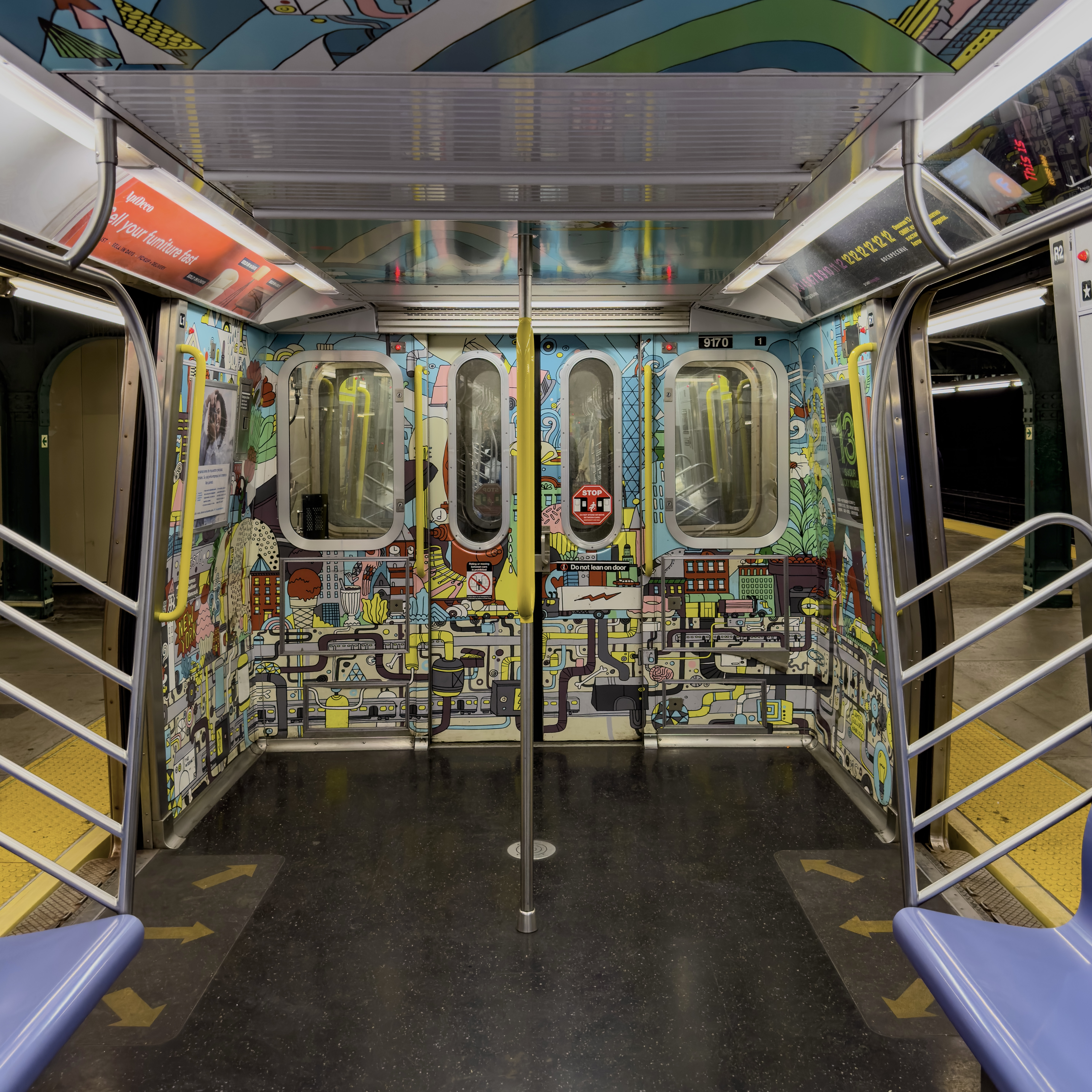
An R160 with Subway Action pilot features and interior artwork

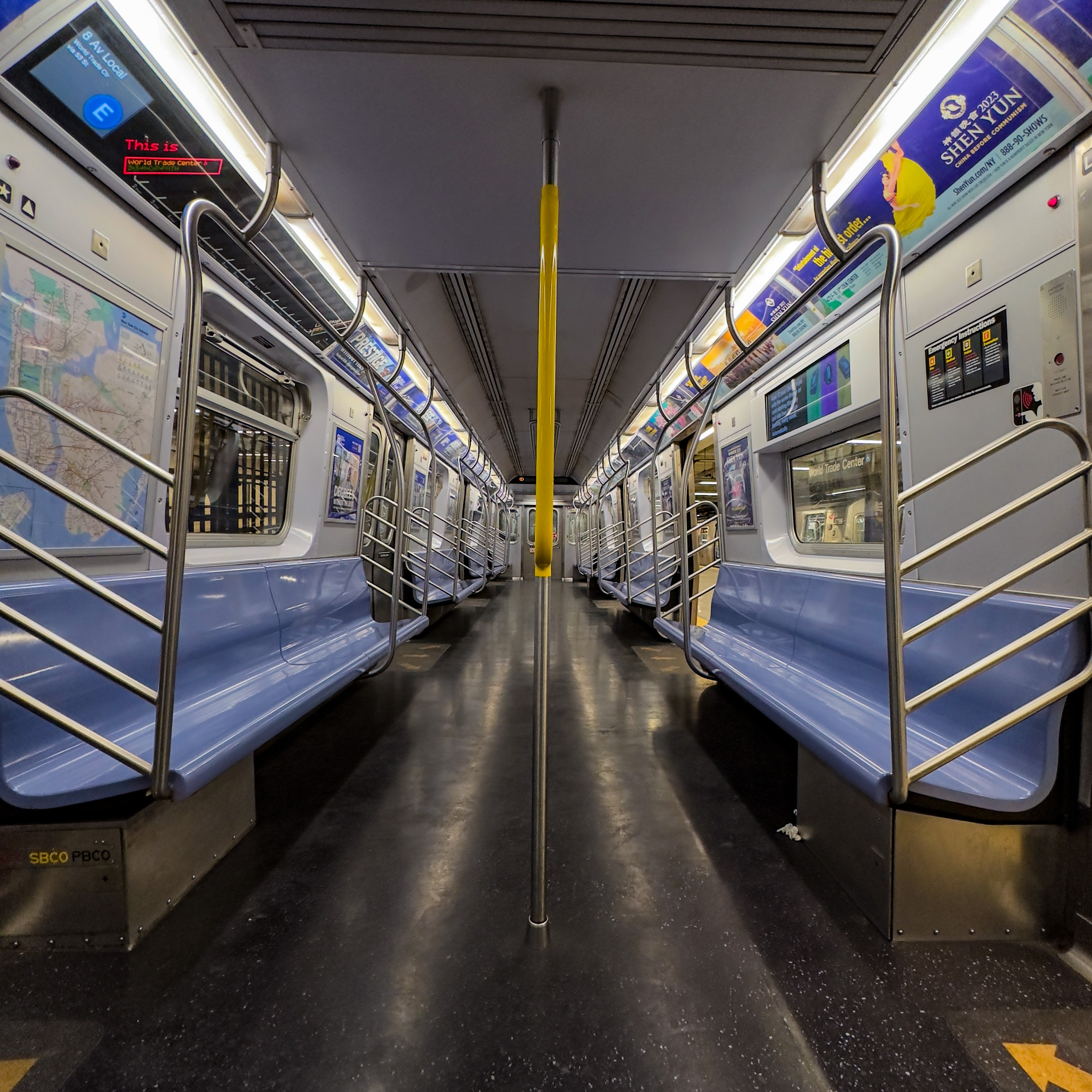
The interior of a refurbished R160
