= Neighborhood planning =

Neighborhood planning is a form of urban planning through which professional urban planners and communities seek to shape new and existing neighborhoods. It can denote the process of creating a physical neighborhood plan, for example via participatory planning, or an ongoing process through which neighborhood affairs are decided.

The concept of the neighborhood as a spatial unit has a long and contested history. In 1915, Robert E. Park and E. W. Burgess introduced the idea of "neighborhood" as an ecological concept with urban planning implications. Since then, many concepts and ideas of a neighborhood have emerged, including the influential concept of the neighborhood unit. The history of neighborhood planning in the United States extends over a century. City planners have used this process to combat a range a social problems such as community disintegration, economic marginalization, and environmental degradation. The concept was partially employed during the development of new towns in the United Kingdom. The process has been revived as a form of community-led planning in England under the Localism Act 2011.

== Neighborhood planning process ==
There is no set process for neighborhood planning. In some cases, such as statutory neighbourhood planning in England, regulations establish formal steps in the process such as being designated by the Local Planning Authority. The following six steps are typical of a general neighborhood planning process:

1. Defining the neighborhood boundaries
2. Public engagement and consultation
3. Evidence collection
4. Plan-writing
5. Implementation
6. Evaluation and monitoring

The first step in planning for a neighborhood is to define the boundaries of the neighborhood. Neighborhoods can be difficult to define geographically, although neighborhood planning can work with all scales of area, from urban neighborhoods to rural areas. The process of defining boundaries can sometimes be problematic, for example if some areas do not want certain streets or houses to be included within a neighborhood boundary. More than one neighborhood district may attempt to claim a certain street or group of homes. Less problematic neighborhood boundary definitions are sometimes based on existing natural boundaries such as rivers, existing administrative boundaries, or based on census information.

After the boundaries of the plan are established, those leading the plan should decide how to get the wider neighborhood involved with the planning process. To define the goals of the plan, public participation of local residents and stakeholders is often considered central. A city official may do all of the planning with minimal contact or input from the residents or the plan may be undertaken by a self-selected group of residents who do not seek or else ignore input from others in the neighborhood. However it is typically assumed that the involvement of as many residents as possible is desirable, or the outcome may lack critical information and perspectives and thus not fully represent the desires of the neighborhood residents.

Many strategies may be used to involve neighborhood residents in the planning process and outreach methods may be used to generate interest. Planners can involve neighbors by collecting data and information about the area and how the residents use it. Community development practitioners are often asked to assist with consultation as they can act as an independent facilitator to engagement. Planners can then combine the information they have gathered from residents with other evidence at their disposal. This might include retail or employment surveys, demographic data or housing needs assessments.

Once data from community consultation and evidence collection have been collated, a neighbourhood plan can be drafted. Successful neighbourhood plans typically seek to deliver community wishes in ways that are supported by the underpinning evidence. This may be achieved by generating policy alternatives before consulting again with the wider community to decide among them. The next step is to figure out how to implement the plan the committee has created. This requires the planning committee to decide what actions need to take place to effectively implement the plan. The committee must decide what resources are available, and how to create more available resources.

The final step of neighborhood planning is generally considered to be evaluating and monitoring. Planning and sustaining a functional neighborhood involves iterations of work and decision-making, and so plans may also be revised or replaced by a new plan.

== Neighbourhood planning in England ==
A statutory form of neighborhood planning was introduced in England by the Localism Act 2011. This allowed designated qualifying bodies (either a Parish or Town Council, or neighbourhood forum made up of local residents) to produce a Neighbourhood Development Plan setting planning policy for the relevant neighbourhood. Neighbourhood Development Plans must pass certain Basic Conditions to the satisfaction of an independent examiner before advancing to a local referendum. If successful at referendum, the Neighbourhood Development Plan becomes a statutory planning document that the Local Planning Authority must consider in future planning decisions.

A community right to build order is "a particular type of neighbourhood development order", established by the Localism Act, enabling a "community organisation ... established for the express purpose of furthering the social, economic and environmental well-being of individuals living, or wanting to live, in a particular area" to take a lead role in planning the development of a locality or neighbourhood. The community right to build is one of a set of community rights established under the Localism Act, alongside the community right to challenge and the community right to bid.

== Critiques of participation ==
Efforts to promote public participation through neighborhood planning have been widely critiqued. There is particular concern regarding the potential capture of the public into the sphere of influence of governance stakeholders, leaving communities frustrated by participatory initiatives. In England, where communities may produce statutory Neighbourhood Development Plans, evidence has shown that neighborhood planning has promoted sustainability and social purpose in the housing market, however it has also been critiqued for concentrating too heavily on housing growth at the expense of community empowerment. That neighborhood planning is a complex and often burdensome process, primarily undertaken by more affluent, rural neighborhoods has also been long-standing criticism. Researchers have questioned whether Neighbourhood Planning in England is democratically legitimate where those leading the plan are not representative of the wider community.

== See also ==
- Median voter theorem
- Urban planning
- Public Participation GIS
- Parish Plan
- Village design statement
- Localism Act 2011
