= Rural community development =

Field of research

Rural community development encompasses a range of approaches and activities that aim to improve the welfare and livelihoods of people living in rural areas. As a branch of community development, these approaches pay attention to social issues particularly community organizing. This is in contrast to other forms of rural development that focus on public works (e.g. rural roads and electrification) and technology (e.g. tools and techniques for improving agricultural production).

Rural community development is important in developing countries where a large part of the population is engaged in farming. Consequently, a range of community development methods have been created and used by organisations involved in international development. Most of these efforts to promote rural community development are led by 'experts' from outside the community such as government officials, staff of non-governmental organizations and foreign advisers. This has led to a long debate about the issue of participation, in which questions have been raised about the sustainability of these efforts and the extent to which rural people are – or are not – being empowered to make decisions for themselves. The international association for Community Development (IACD) is the main global network for practitioners and scholars working in this field www.iacdglobal.org

== United Kingdom ==
In the UK rural community development is seen as very important. Rural areas are often some of the most deprived in the country. Rural Community Councils around the country support local rural communities in securing sustainable futures. The local rural communities are supported by experienced community development workers.

In Pembrokeshire (Wales), Pembrokeshire Local Action Network for Enterprise and Development (PLANED) apply a community-led integrated approach to rural development, in which communities, public sector and voluntary partners and specialist interest groups come together to undertake development. PLANED has a long experience of introducing and developing pioneering methodologies, tools, techniques and processes for the engagement of communities in local development. This best practice has been shared across Europe, primarily through the LEADER network.

In 2004 the Carnegie UK Trust established a Commission of Inquiry into the future of rural community development across the UK and Ireland. The Commission was chaired by Lord Steel, the former leader of the Liberal Party and included in its membership Lord Haskins and Jonathan Porritt. It was also informed by a country wide action research programme funding over 60 projects in partnership with the Big Lottery Fund. This was the largest rural community development programme in the UK and lasted until 2010. The Trust also funded national and international communities of practice to exchange experiences. This included the International Association for Community Development and work around the potential impact of climate change on vulnerable rural communities and the need for more sustainable development approaches to land use. The Commission produced a number of influential reports.

== United States ==
In the United States, rural community development is an essential tool in keeping rural areas economically viable in a competitive global arena. Under the United States Department of Agriculture, this is addressed through the Rural Development mission area, comprising the Rural Housing Service, Rural Utilities Service, and Rural Business-Cooperative Service. Research and data sources for rural areas of the United States is also addressed by the United States Department of Agriculture through the Economic Research Service, the National Institute of Food and Agriculture and the National Agricultural Library’s Rural Information Center.

The Center for Rural Affairs is a grassroots organization originating in Nebraska that puts an emphasis on leadership development to reinvigorate rural communities. They strive to promote entrepreneurship and increase the farm returns per food dollar to maintain the economy in rural areas.

Colleges and Universities, many located in rural communities, have also played a key role in rural community development throughout United States history. The Morrill Land-Grant Act of 1862 provided funding for agricultural education. Since the passage of the Morrill Act, there has been significant demographic changes in the population of colleges, including student gender, population size and number of commuters. This shift has created opportunities for rural colleges to play a part in the development of the communities in which they reside.

== See also ==
- Development criticism
- Economic Development Administration
- Organization Workshop
- Rural Community Councils
- Rural development
- Social exclusion
- Social justice
- Village
