= Parish plan =

In England, parish plans are a form of community-led plan.

Parish plans determine the future of communities and how they can change for the better. They are documents that set out a vision for the future of a parish and outlines how that can be achieved in an action plan.

The parish plan process may include:

- a village appraisal – a household questionnaire to assess needs and aspirations of local people
- participatory appraisals – hands-on interactive workshops
- business surveys
- the creation of an action plan

Members of the rural community action network support groups in local communities to create parish plans.

Another type of community-led plan is a village design statement.

== See also ==
- Neighborhood planning
- Rural community council
