= Jaguara =

District of São Paulo, Brazil

Coordinates: 12°07′S 39°06′W

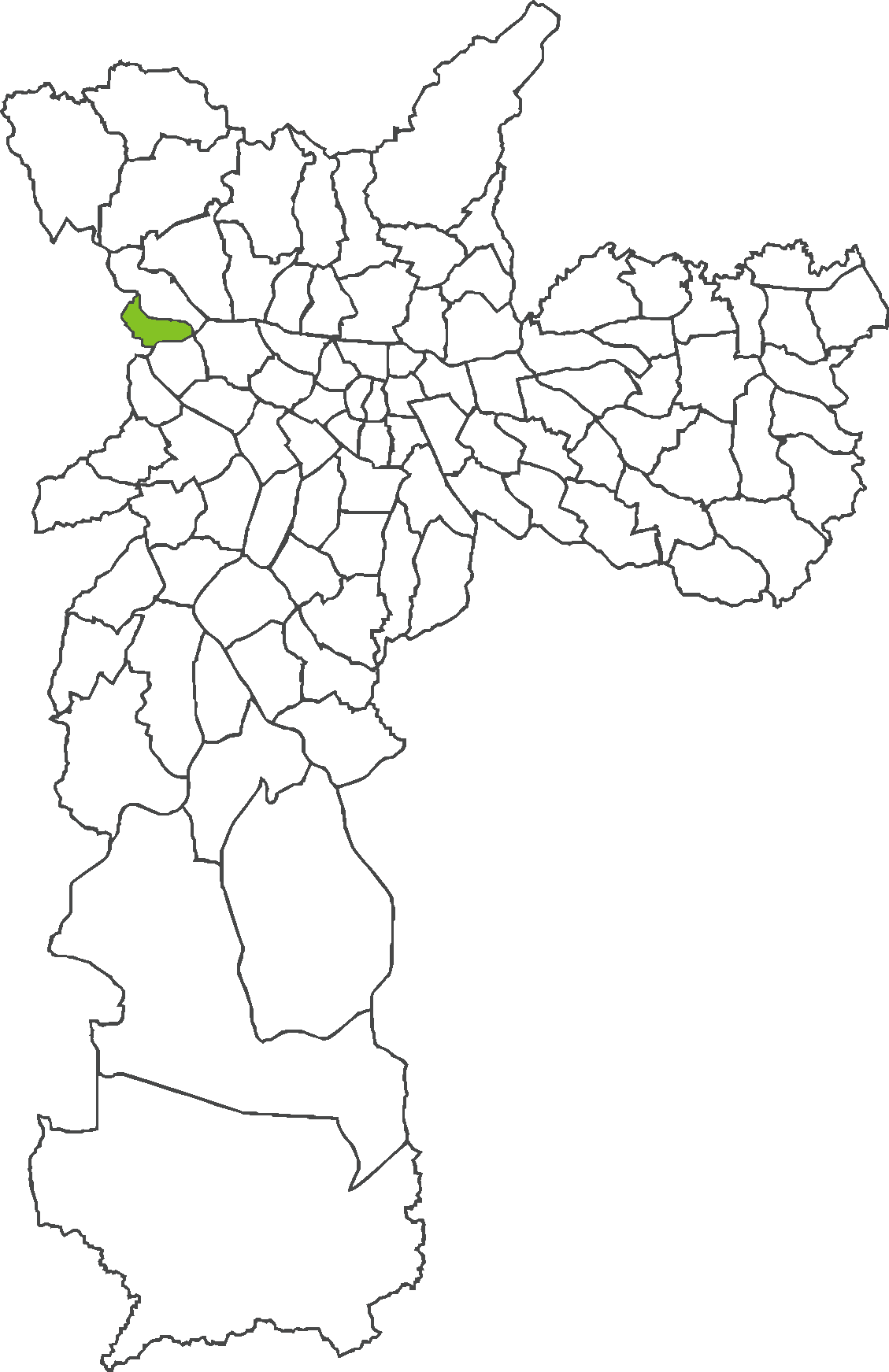
- Location in the city of São Paulo

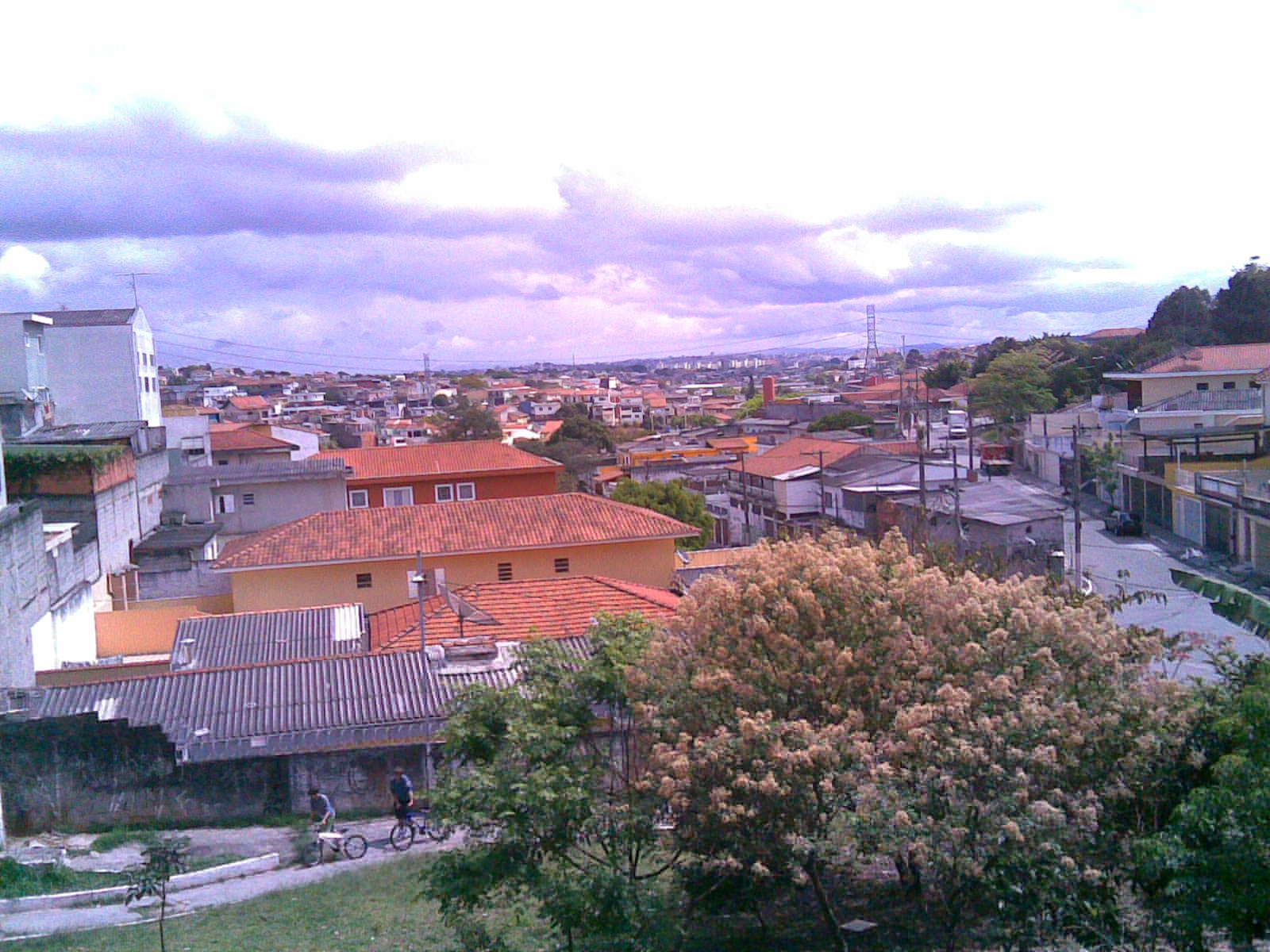
- Country: Brazil
- State: São Paulo
- City: São Paulo

Government
  - Type: Subprefecture
  - Subprefect: Soninha Francine

Area
  - Total: 5.6 km^{2} (2.2 sq mi)

Population (2000)
  - Total: 25.713
- HDI: 0.863 –high
- Website: Subprefecture of Lapa

Jaguara is a district in the subprefecture of Lapa in the city of São Paulo, Brazil.
