= Manakpur =

- Location within Pakistan
- Coordinates: 32.45°N 72.43°E
- Country: Pakistan
- Province: Punjab
- Elevation: 726 m (2,382 ft)
- Time zone: UTC+5 (PST)

Manakpur is a village in the Punjab province of Pakistan. It is located at 32°45'0N 72°43'0E with an altitude of 726 metres (2385 feet).

== See also ==
- Baidauli
