= Jaguaré (district of São Paulo) =

District of São Paulo, Brazil

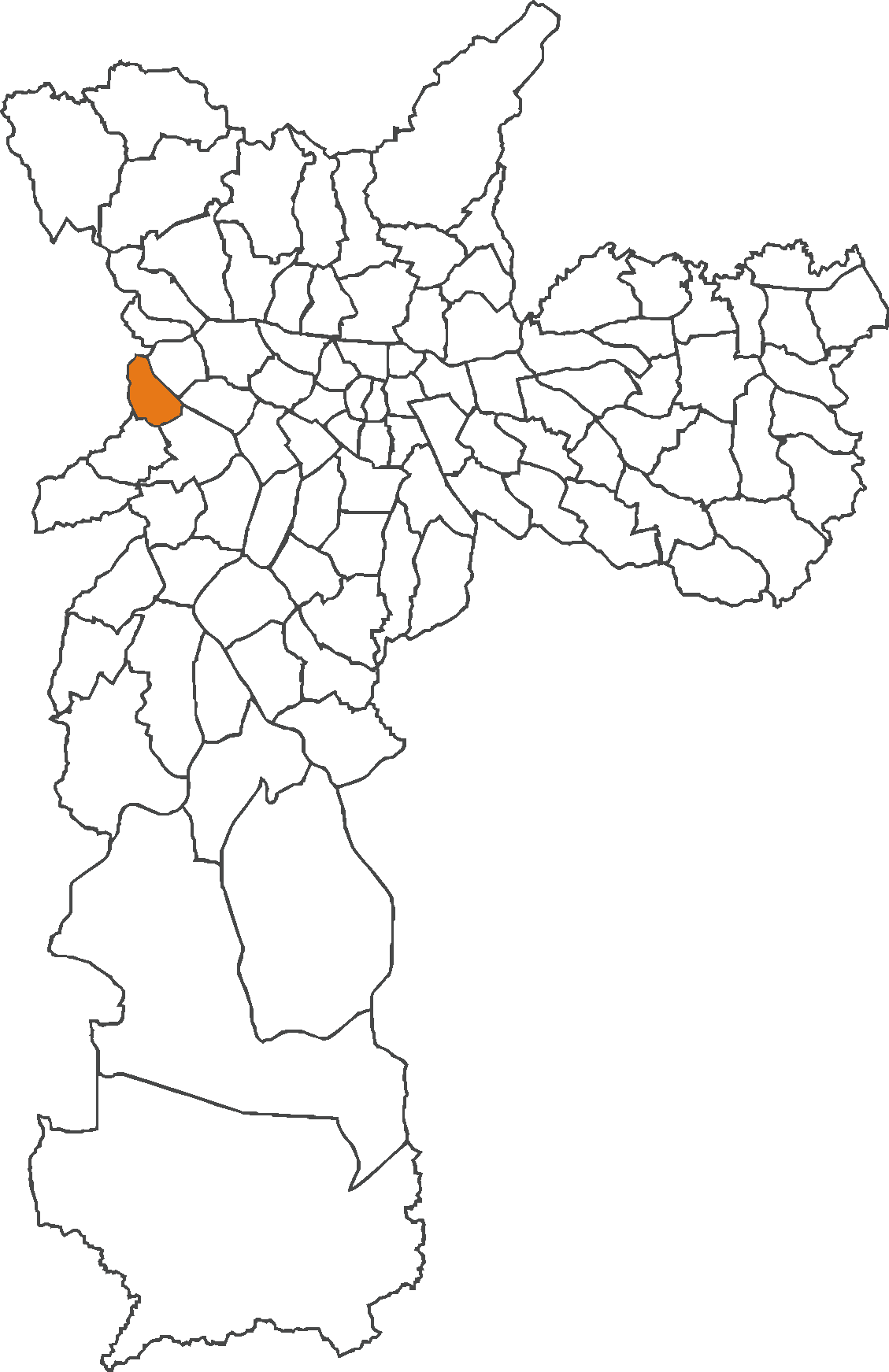
- Location in the city of São Paulo

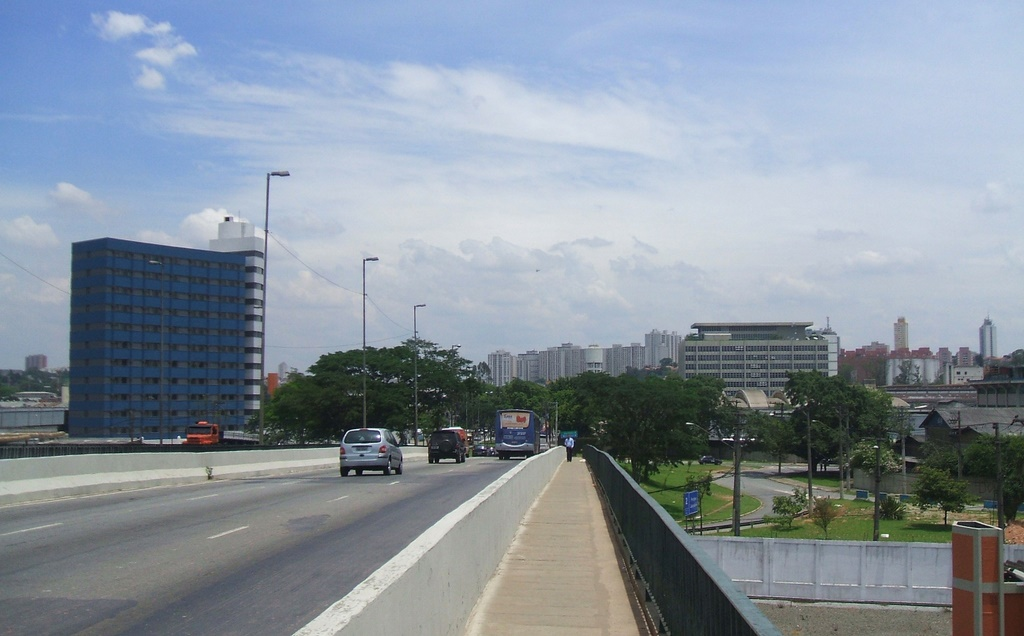
- Country: Brazil
- State: São Paulo
- City: São Paulo

Government
  - Type: Subprefecture
  - Subprefect: Soninha Francine

Population (2000)
  - Total: 42.479
- HDI: 0.849 –high
- Website: Subprefecture of Lapa

Jaguaré is a district in the subprefecture of Lapa in the city of São Paulo, Brazil.
