= Village design statement =

Village design statement (VDS) is a term of English rural planning practice. A VDS is a document that describes the distinctive characteristics of the locality, and provides design guidance to influence future development and improve the physical qualities of the area.

Drawing up the VDS provides an opportunity for communities to describe how they feel the physical character of their parish can be enhanced. Rural community councils support local communities in the production of village design statements.

== See also ==
- Parish plan
- Auroville Village Action Group
- Village development committee (India)
