= Subprefecture of Lapa =

Coordinates: 23°31′11″S 46°42′15″W

- Subprefecture
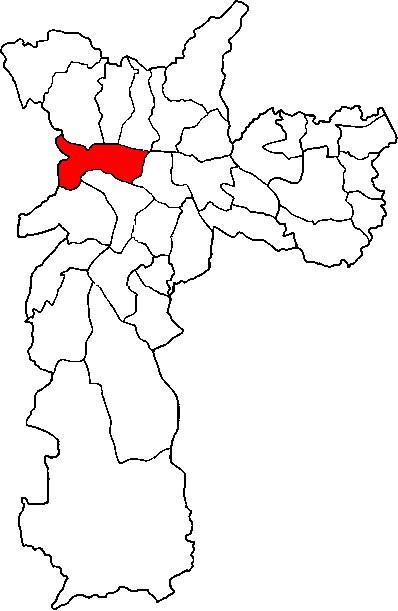
- Location of the Subprefecture of Lapa in São Paulo

- Location of municipality of São Paulo within the State of São Paulo
- Country: Brazil
- Region: Southeast
- State: São Paulo
- Municipality: São Paulo
- Administrative Zone: West
- Districts: Lapa, Barra Funda, Perdizes, Vila Leopoldina, Jaguaré, Jaguara

Government
  - Type: Subprefecture
  - Subprefect: Carlos Eduardo Batista

Area
  - Total: 40.57 km^{2} (15.66 sq mi)

Population (2008)
  - Total: 255,185
- Website: Subprefeitura Lapa (Portuguese)

The Subprefecture of Lapa is one of 32 subprefectures of the city of São Paulo, Brazil. It comprises six districts: Lapa, Barra Funda, Perdizes, Vila Leopoldina, Jaguaré, and Jaguara.

In the north area of Lapa, which comprises the bairros of Barra Funda, Água Branca and the "Low Lapa" (Lapa de baixo) most of the people are descendants of proletarian families who once worked in the two main railways of the city: São Paulo Railway and the Sorocabana. Today, both of these railways station have become local urban train stations.

The southern area of the subprefecture, which includes the "High Lapa" (Alto da Lapa) and the bairros of Perdizes, Sumaré and Pompéia, is a high-class area and has many historic buildings, and has many descendant of the English engineers who built the railways. Also the main campus of the Pontifical Catholic University of São Paulo (PUC-SP) is located in this place, in the district of Perdizes, as well as Allianz Arena, home of the football team Palmeiras.
