= Lapa (district of São Paulo) =

District of São Paulo, Brazil

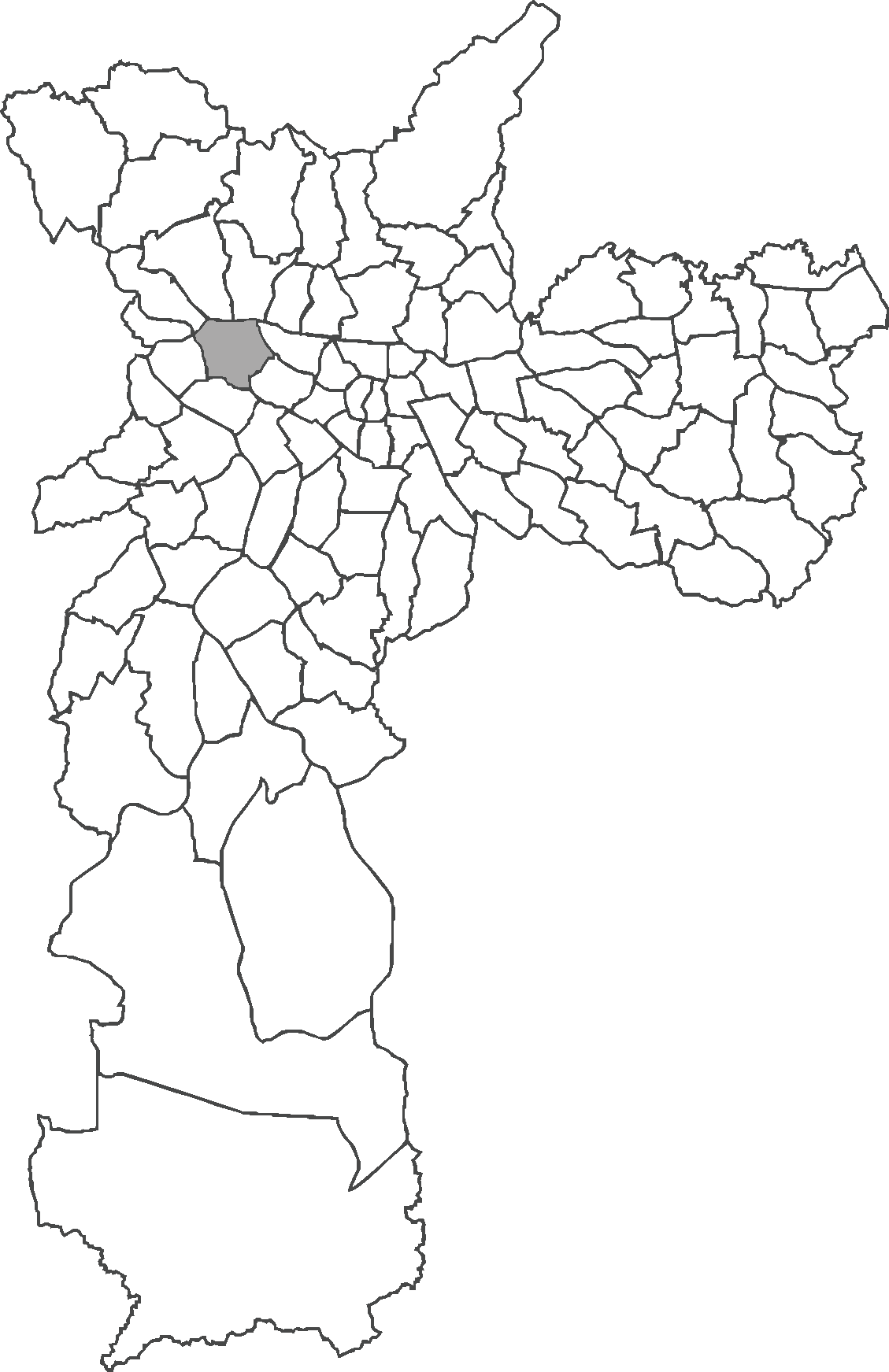
- Location in the city of São Paulo

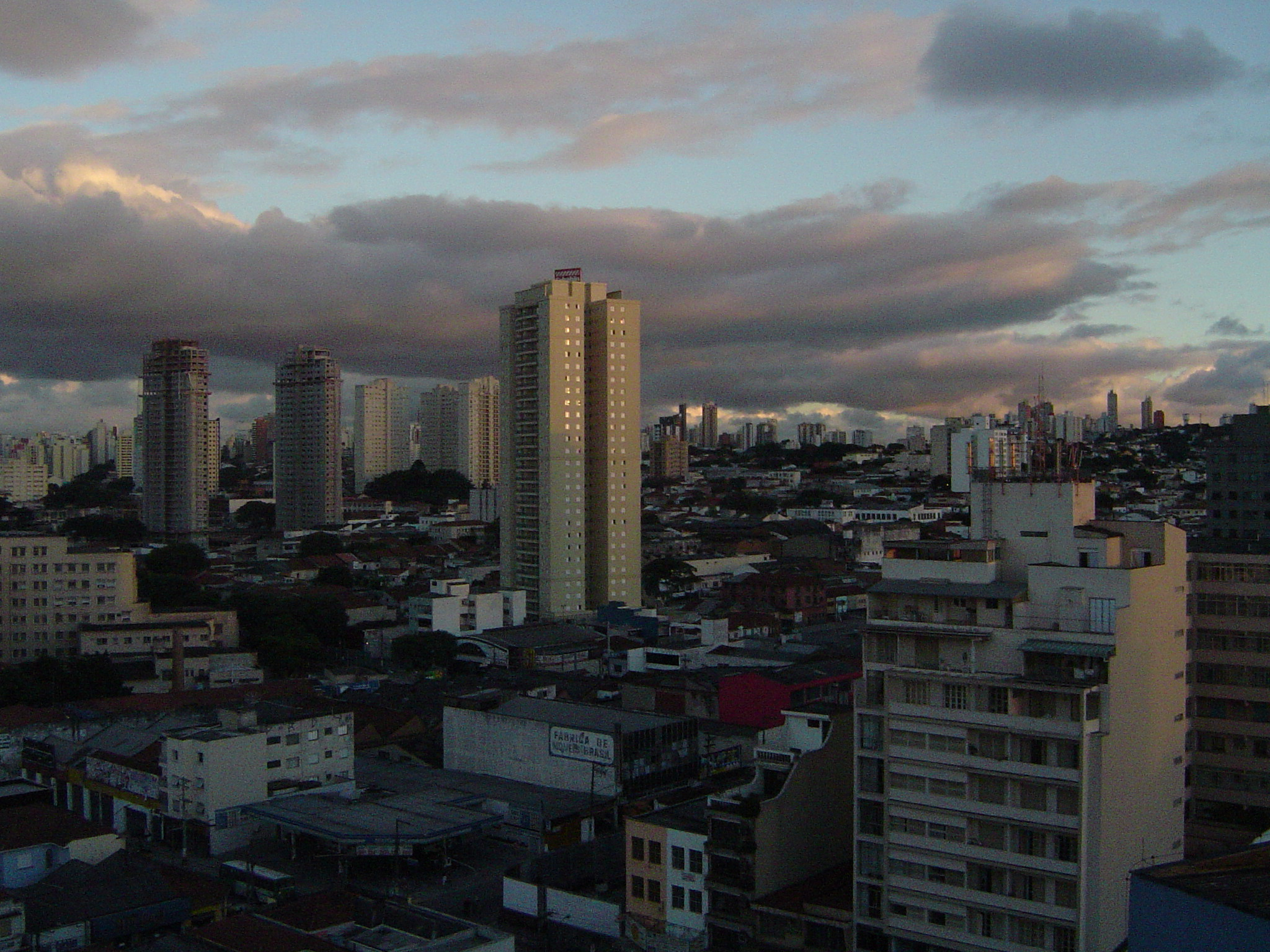
- Country: Brazil
- State: São Paulo
- City: São Paulo

Population (2000)
  - Total: 60.066
  - Density: 6.007/km^{2} (15.56/sq mi)
- HDI: 0.941 –high
- Website: Subprefecture of Lapa

Lapa is a district in the subprefecture of the same name in the city of São Paulo, Brazil.
