= Village development committee (India) =

Village Development Committees (VDCs) are voluntary associations of village people for local administration. They are extra constitutional authorities.

VDCs consist of two members from each caste in the village. The unity of villages can be accredited to these VDCs. The decision of VDCs are ultimate in the concerned villages and persons who disobey the judgement of VDC are boycotted from the villages.

The aim of VDCs are to have villagers solve local problems, without the need of police or courts, aiming to achieve a strong socially fabricated society.

An example of a VDC is Ankapur Village Development Committee. Armoor Mandal has progressed greatly with the help of this VDC.

== See also ==
- Village development committee (Nepal)
- Land-use planning
