= Rural community council =

The rural community councils (RCCs) were established in rural England during the twentieth century to promote rural community life.

Each shire county now has one, although some are relative newcomers. The RCCs also form a national coalition called Action with Communities in Rural England ("ACRE").

Each RCC is an independent, locally managed organisation but is dependent on external funding for its continued work. Historically, RCCs were primarily funded by the Rural Development Commission, but this role was subsequently taken over by the Countryside Agency. Most RCCs are also funded through project work linked to their aims and objectives, and from work undertaken for their closely related county-wide organisations representing parish councils and playing field committees.

Community councils in Scotland and Wales are different and exist on a statutory basis.

== See also ==
- Parish councils in England
- Parish plan
- Rural community development
- Rural Development Council
- Rural district council
- Village design statement
