= Cosmic Philosophy =

Cosmic Philosophy is the name Max Théon gave to the occult teachings given by his wife Alma Théon and himself. It is presented in the journal Cosmic Review, the six volumes of the Cosmic Tradition, and the Cosmic Movement they established in the first decade of the twentieth century.

Apart from the Théons themselves, important contributors to the Cosmic Philosophy material included Charles Barlet, Victor-Emile Michelet, M. J. Benharoche-Baralia, and Pascal Themanlys.

Elements of the Cosmic Philosophy can also be found in the teachings of The Mother of the Sri Aurobindo Ashram, who, as Mirra Alfassa, was Théon's student in occultism, and was involved in the Cosmic Movement. Some of Théon's terminology was also adopted by Sri Aurobindo.

The Cosmic Philosophy claims to be the original spiritual tradition, and describes an occult cosmology that outlines the various emanated planes of existence and cosmic cycles, including the sixth and the present, seventh, cycle, as well as detailing the various occult powers of man.
