= Astral body (disambiguation) =

The astral body is a Theosophical syncretic concept, one of the Theosophical subtle bodies.

Astral body may also refer to:

- Body of light, a Western esoteric concept, once synonymous with "astral body"
- Illusory body, a Vajrayana and Tibetan Buddhist concept, equivalent to the "astral body"
- Subtle body, an Eastern esoteric concept, later dubbed "astral body" by Theosophy

== See also ==
- Luminous mind, a Buddhist concept
- Okhema, a Neoplatonic concept
- Subtle body (disambiguation)
