= Subtle body (disambiguation) =

A subtle body is an Eastern and Western esoteric concept.

Subtle body may also refer to:

- Body of light, a Western esoteric concept
- Causal body, a Hindu and Theosophical concept
- Etheric body, a Theosophical concept
- Illusory body, a Vajrayana and Tibetan Buddhist concept
- Mental body, a Theosophical concept
- The Subtle Body, a 2010 book by Stefanie Syman

== See also ==
- Astral body (disambiguation)
- Okhema, a Neoplatonic concept
