= Astral body =

Concept of a subtle body, intermediate between the soul and body

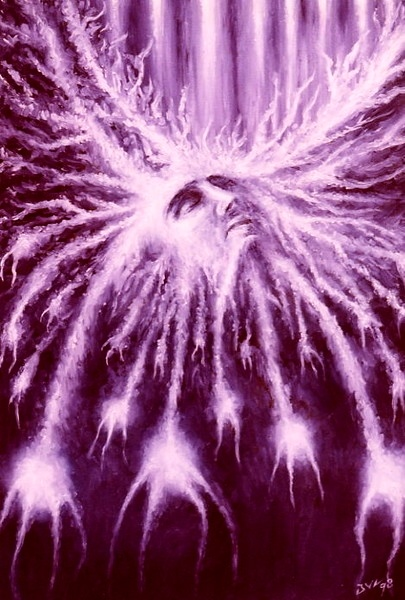
The Astral Sleep (1998) by Jeroen van Valkenburg

The astral body is a subtle body posited by many philosophers, intermediate between the intelligent soul and the mental body, composed of a subtle material. In many recensions the concept ultimately derives from the philosophy of Plato though the same or similar ideas have existed all over the world well before Plato's time: it is related to an astral plane, which consists of the planetary heavens of astrology. The term was adopted by nineteenth-century Theosophists and neo-Rosicrucians.

The idea is rooted in common worldwide religious accounts of the afterlife in which the soul's journey or "ascent" is described in such terms as "an ecstatic.., mystical or out-of body experience, wherein the spiritual traveller leaves the physical body and travels in his/her subtle body (or dreambody or astral body) into 'higher' realms". Hence "the "many kinds of 'heavens', 'hells', and purgatorial existences believed in by followers of innumerable religions" may also be understood as astral phenomena, as may the various "phenomena of the séance room". The phenomenon of apparitional experience is therefore related, as is made explicit in Cicero's Dream of Scipio.

The astral body is sometimes said to be visible as an aura of swirling colours. It is widely linked today with out-of-body experiences or astral projection. Where this refers to a supposed movement around the real world, as in Muldoon and Carrington's book The Projection of the Astral Body, it conforms to Madame Blavatsky's usage of the term. Elsewhere, this latter is termed "etheric", while "astral" denotes an experience of dream-symbols, archetypes, memories, spiritual beings and visionary landscapes.

== History ==
=== The classical world ===
Neoplatonists agreed with Plato as to the immortality of the rational soul but disagreed as to whether man's "irrational soul" was immortal and celestial ("starry", hence astral) or whether it remained on earth and dissolved after death. The late Neoplatonist Proclus, who is credited the first to speak of subtle "planes", posited two subtle bodies or "carriers" (okhema) intermediate between the rational soul and the physical body. These were; 1) the astral vehicle which was the immortal vehicle of the Soul and 2) the spiritual (pneuma) vehicle, aligned with the vital breath, which he considered mortal.

The word "astral" means "of the stars", thus the astral plane, consisting of the celestial spheres, is held to be an astrological phenomenon: "The whole of the astral portion of our earth and of the physical planets, together with the purely astral planets of our System, make up collectively the astral body of the Solar Logos". There are "seven types of astral matter" by means of which "psychic changes occur periodically".

=== The Modern Era ===
Such ideas greatly influenced medieval religious thought and are visible in the Renaissance medicine of Paracelsus and Servetus. In the romantic era, alongside the discovery of electromagnetism and the nervous system, there came a new interest in the spirit world. Franz Anton Mesmer spoke of the stars, animal magnetism and magnetic fluids. In 1801, the English occultist Francis Barrett wrote of a herb's "excellent astral and magnetic powers" – for herbalists had categorised herbs according to their supposed correspondence with the seven planetary influences.

In the mid-nineteenth century the French occultist Eliphas Levi wrote much of "the astral light", a factor he considered of key importance to magic, alongside the power of will and the doctrine of correspondences. He considered the astral light the medium of all light, energy and movement, describing it in terms that recall both Mesmer and the luminiferous ether.

Levi's idea of the astral was to have much influence in the English-speaking world through the teachings of The Golden Dawn, but it was also taken up by Helena Blavatsky and discussed in the key work of Theosophy, The Secret Doctrine. Levi seems to have been regarded by later Theosophists as the immediate source from which the term was adopted into their sevenfold schema of planes and bodies, though there was slight confusion as to the term's proper use.

=== Theosophy ===
Blavatsky frequently used the term "astral body" in connection with the Indian linga sharira which is one of the seven principles of human life. However, she said that "there are various astral bodies". For example, she talked of one as being constituted by "the lower manas and volition, kama" According to the Theosophical founder William Q. Judge "There are many names for the Astral Body. Here are a few: Linga Sarira, Sanskrit, meaning design body, and the best one of all; ethereal double; phantom; wraith; apparition; doppelgänger; personal man; perispirit; irrational soul; animal soul; Bhuta; elementary; spook; devil; demon. Some of these apply only to the astral body when devoid of the corpus after death."

C.W. Leadbeater and Annie Besant (Theosophical Society Adyar), equated it with Blavatsky's Kama (desire) principle and called it the Emotional body. Astral body, desire body, and emotional body became synonymous, and this identification is found in later Theosophically inspired thought. The astral body in later Theosophy is "the vehicle of feelings and emotions" through which "it is possible...to experience all varieties of desire". We have a "life in the astral body, whilst the physical body is wrapped in slumber". So the astral body "provides a simple explanation of the mechanism of many phenomena revealed by modern psycho-analysis". To this extent, then, the "astral body" is a reification of the dream-world self.

=== Post-theosophists ===
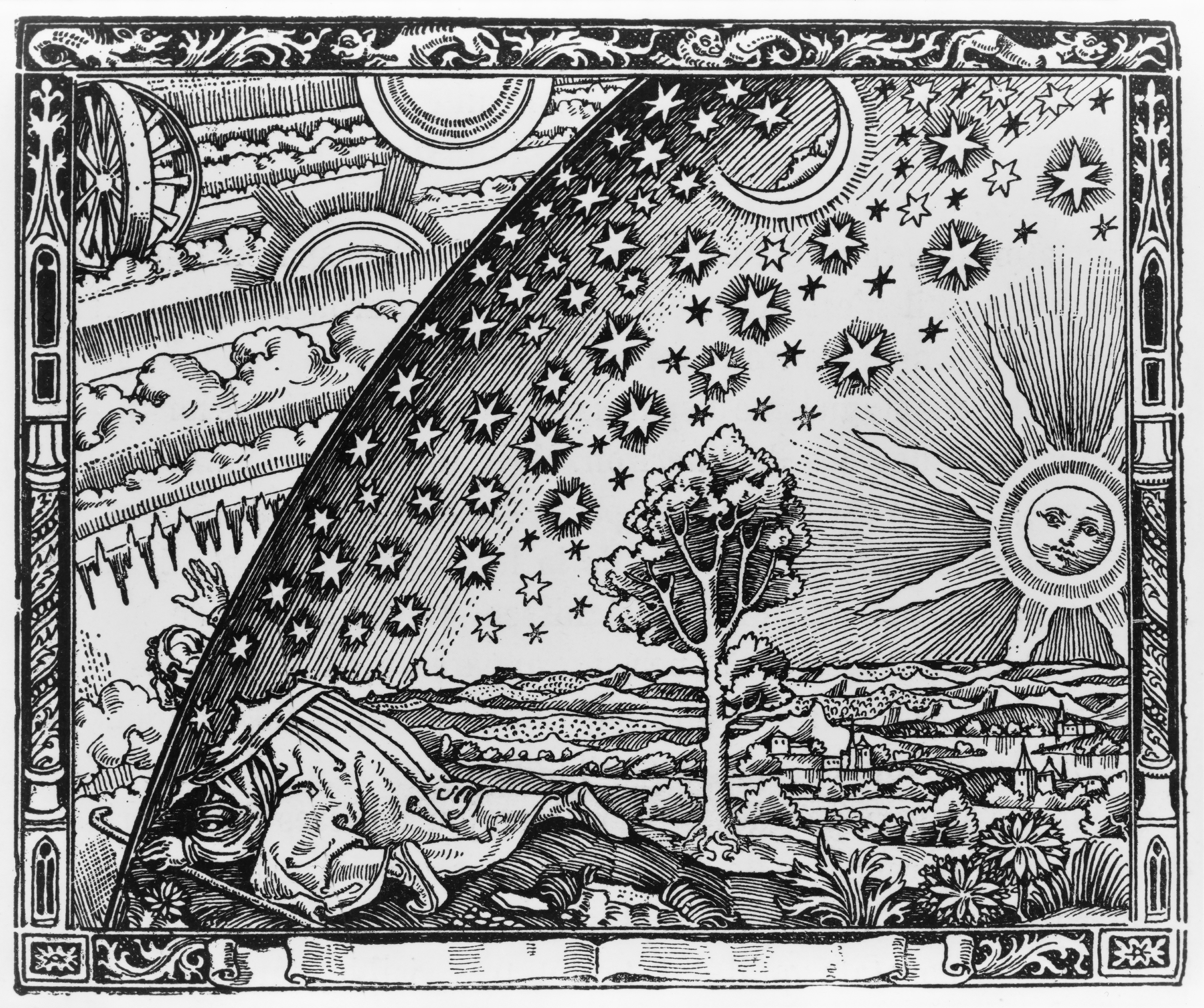
Anonymous Flammarion engraving (1888)

According to Max Heindel's Rosicrucian writings, the Desire body is made of desire stuff, from which human beings form feelings and emotions. It is said to appear to spiritual sight as an ovoid cloud extending from sixteen to twenty inches beyond the physical body. It has a number of whirling vortices (chakras) and from the main vortex, in the region of the liver, there is a constant flow which radiates and returns.

However, the astral body (or "Soul body") must be evolved by means of the work of transmutation and will eventually be evolved by humanity as a whole. According to Heindel, the term "astral body" was employed by the mediaeval Alchemists because of the ability it conferred to traverse the "starry" regions. The "Astral body" is regarded as the "Philosopher's Stone" or "Living Stone" of the alchemist, the "Wedding Garment" of the Gospel of Matthew and the "Soul body" that Paul mentions in the First Epistle to the Corinthians

According to Samael Aun Weor, who popularised Theosophical thought in Latin America, the astral body is the part of human soul related to emotions, represented by the sephirah Hod in the kabbalistic Tree of Life. However the common person only has a kamarupa, body of desire or "lunar astral body," a body related to animal emotions, passions and desires, while the true human emotional vehicle is the solar astral body, which can be crystallised through Tantric sex. The solar astral body is the first mediator between the Cosmic Christ, Chokmah, and the individual human soul.

=== Fourth Way ===
"What is called the 'body-Kesdjan', or, as they themselves later began to name this being-part of theirs—of which, by the way, contemporary beings know only by hearsay—the 'Astral-body'." "At first on the planet itself the 'second-being-body,' i.e., the body-Kesdjan, together with the 'third-being-body' separate themselves from the 'fundamental-planetary-body' and, leaving this planetary body on the planet, rise both together to that sphere where those cosmic substances— from the localizations of which the body-Kesdjan of a being arises—have their place of concentration. "And only there, at the end of a certain time, does the principal and final sacred Rascooarno occur to this two-natured arising, after which such a 'higher being-part' indeed becomes an independent individual with its own individual Reason." According to Gurdjieff it is an independent arising which is intermediate between the physical body and the Soul.

Gurdjieff refers to the astral body as the "body Kesdjan" or "vessel of the soul": it is of the sun and all planets, just as the physical body is of the earth. While it is not developed one is a "human being only in quotation marks", who cannot be considered in any meaningful sense to have a soul and who will "die like a dog".

== Scientific reception ==
Donovan Rawcliffe, who noted there is no scientific evidence for an astral body, has written that "delusions and hallucinations due to acenesthesia or hysteria have undoubtedly helped to perpetuate the myth of the astral body."

== See also ==
- Body of light
- Divine illumination
- Divine spark
- Energy being
- Etheric body
- Illusory body
- Psyche
- Saṃbhogakāya
- Silver cord
- Spirit body (Mormonism)
- Subtle body

== Sources ==
- Besant, Annie. Theosophical Manual No. VII: Man and His Bodies. London: Theosophical Publishing House, 1914.
- Brennan, Barbara Ann. Hands of Light : A Guide to Healing Through the Human Energy Field, Bantam Books, 1987.
- Brennan, Barbara Ann. Light Emerging: The Journey of Personal Healing, Bantam Books, 1993.
- Kunz, Dora van Gelder. The Personal Aura. Wheaton, IL: Quest Books/Theosophical Publishing House, 1991.
- C. W. Leadbeater. Man, Visible and Invisible. London: Theosophical Publishing House, 1902.
- [Carl Edwin Lindgren]. 2005. Debunking Auras and Aura Cameras.
- Martin, Barbara Y., with Dmitri Moraitis. Change Your Aura, Change Your Life. Sunland, Cal.: Wisdomlight, 2003.
- The Mother (Alfassa, Mirra). Collected Works. 17 vols. Pondicherry: Sri Aurobindo Ashram, 1972-1987.
- Poortman, J.J. Vehicles of consciousness: the concept of hylic pluralism (Ochēma). 4 vols. Utrecht: The Theosophical Society in Netherlands, 1978.
- Powell, Arthur E. The astral body and other astral phenomena. Wheaton, Ill.: Theosophical Pub. House, 1927 (repr. 1992).
- Satprem, ed. Mother's agenda: agenda of the supramental action upon earth. 13 vols. Paris: Institut de recherches évolutives; Mysore: Mira Aditi, 1979-1982.
- Steiner, Rudolf, Theosophy: An introduction to the supersensible knowledge of the world and the destination of man. London: Rudolf Steiner Press, 1904 (repr. 1970).
- Steiner, Rudolf, Occult Science - An Outline. Trans. George and Mary Adams. London: Rudolf Steiner Press, 1909 (repr. 1969).
- Heindel, Max, The Rosicrucian Mysteries (Chapter IV: The Constitution of Man: Vital Body - Desire Body - Mind), 1911, ISBN 0-911274-86-3.
- Walker, Benjamin, Beyond the Body: The Human Double, Routledge and Kegan Paul, London, 1974, ISBN 0-7100-7808-0; Fitzhenry, Toronto, 1974; Arkana, 1988, ISBN 0-14-019169-0.
- Woolger, Roger J. (n.d.). "Beyond Death: Transition and the Afterlife" (PDF). Royal College of Psychiatrists. Archived from the original (PDF) on 2008-10-02.
- Yogananda, Paramahansa, Autobiography of a Yogi, Los Angeles, Cal.: Self-Realization Fellowship, 1946, Chapter 43.
