= Spiritual body =

In Christianity, a concept mentioned in the New Testament (1 Corinthians 15:44)

In Christianity, the apostle Paul introduced the concept of the spiritual body (Koine Greek: sōma pneumatikos) in the New Testament (1 Corinthians 15:44), describing the resurrected body as "spiritual" (pneumatikos) in contrast to the psychical (psychikos) body or "natural body" (a body driven by the soul, which in late antiquity was understood to be a substance capable of giving life, but a type of life inferior to that of the spirit).

So is it with the resurrection of the dead. What is sown is perishable, what is raised is imperishable. It is sown in dishonour, it is raised in glory. It is sown in weakness, it is raised in power. It is sown a natural body (Note: literally "a psychical body"); it is raised a spiritual body. If there is a natural body (Note: literally, "a psychical body"), there is also a spiritual body.

— 1 Corinthians 15:42-44, NIV

Christian teaching traditionally interprets Paul as comparing a resurrected body with a mortal body, saying that it will be a different kind of body; a "spiritual body", meaning an immortal body, or incorruptible body (15:53—54).

== In the Catholic tradition ==
In the Catholic Church, traditionally the resurrected body is called the "glorified body", and retained four characteristics: incorruptibility, subtlety, impassibility, and agility. The bodies of the damned are also raised incorrupt, but not glorified or free from suffering.

== See also ==
- Body of light
- Body of resurrection
- Subtle body
- Sah
