= Cosmic Movement =

The Cosmic Movement was the organisation established by Max Théon around 1900, in Tlemcen, Algeria, at the instigation of his wife Alma Théon, whom he declared to be the moving spirit behind the group. Its journal was the Cosmic Review. Other publications included the Cosmic Tradition, and other works of the Cosmic Philosophy.

Among the most important of Théon's students at this time, who were involved in the Cosmic Movement, in Tlemcen and later in Paris, were Charles Barlet, Mirra Alfassa, Paul Richard, and Louis Themanlys.

According to Pascal Themanlys, other active contributors of the Cosmic Movement included Rene Caillie, the writer Marc Semenoff, the typesetter Jacques Janin, the painters Jacques Blot and Louis Bouchet, the architect Louis Berthaud, Maurice Ben Haroche, the Baroness of Eichthal, among others.

Also interested in the cosmic work were Tomáš Masaryk (who became the first President of Czechoslovakia), the poets Helene Vacaresco and Anna de Noailles, Dr Serge Voronoff, the occultist Edouard Schure, the psychologist Albert von Schrenck-Notzing, the Princess of Rohan in Vienna, the Hellenist Mario Meunier, General Zinovy Peshkov, the Marchioness Ali Maccarani of Florence, and others.
