= Gnosis =

Common Greek noun for knowledge

Gnosis is the common Greek noun for knowledge (γνῶσις, gnōsis, f.). The term was used among various Hellenistic religions and philosophies in the Greco-Roman world. It is best known for its implication within Gnosticism, where it signifies a spiritual knowledge or insight into humanity's real nature as divine, leading to the deliverance of the divine spark within humanity from the constraints of earthly existence.

== Etymology ==
Gnosis is a feminine Greek noun which means "knowledge" or "awareness." It is often used for personal knowledge as opposed to intellectual knowledge (εἴδειν eídein), as with the French connaître compared with savoir, the Portuguese conhecer compared with saber, the Spanish conocer compared with saber, the Italian conoscere compared with sapere, the German kennen rather than wissen, or the Modern Greek γνωρίζω compared with ξέρω.

A related term is the adjective gnostikos, "cognitive", a reasonably common adjective in Classical Greek. The terms do not appear to indicate any mystic, esoteric or hidden meaning in the works of Plato, but instead express a sort of higher intelligence and ability analogous to talent.

Stranger: In this way, then, divide all science into two arts, calling the one practical (praktikos), and the other purely intellectual (gnostikos).
Younger Socrates: Let us assume that all science is one and that these are its two forms.

— Plato's Statesman, 258e

In the Hellenistic era the term became associated with the mystery cults.

In the Acts of Thomas, translated by G.R.S. Mead, the "motions of gnosis" are also referred to as "kingly motions".

Irenaeus used the phrase "knowledge falsely so-called" (pseudonymos gnosis, from 1 Timothy 6:20) for the title of his book On the Detection and Overthrow of False Knowledge, that contains the adjective gnostikos, which is the source for the 17th-century English term "Gnosticism".

== Subtle distinctions ==
=== Epignosis ===
The difference and meaning of epignosis (Greek: ἐπίγνωσις) contrasted with gnosis is disputed. One proposed distinction is between the abstract and absolute knowledge (gnosis) and a practical or more literal knowledge (epignosis). Other interpretations have suggested that 2 Peter is referring to an "epignosis of Jesus Christ", what J. B. Lightfoot described as a "larger and more thorough knowledge". Conversion to Christianity is seen as evidence of the deeper knowledge protecting against false doctrine.

=== Episteme ===
Episteme, like gnosis, is a Greek word for "knowledge," but they represent distinct kinds of understanding—though not necessarily exclusively. Episteme refers to knowledge gained through experience and reason. It encompasses the body of ideas we typically recognize as knowledge, and is the source of our word epistemology. Gnosis, however, is often associated with experiential, intuitive, or spiritual understanding rather than empirical or logical deduction. While episteme deals with objective truths and verifiable facts, gnosis is more concerned with personal insight, inner transformation, and an engagement more ineffable than explicable.

== Gnosticism ==
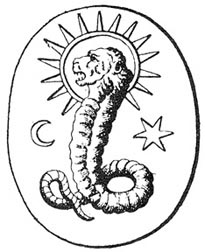
A lion-faced, serpentine deity found on a Gnostic gem in Bernard de Montfaucon's L'antiquité expliquée et représentée en figures may be a depiction of the Demiurge.

Gnosticism originated in the late 1st century CE in non-rabbinical Judaism and developed further within early Christianity. In the early years of Christianity, various sectarian groups, labeled "gnostics" by their opponents, emphasised salvation by secret knowledge (gnosis), over faith (pistis) or grace (gratia) in the teachings and traditions of the various communities of Christians. Gnosticism presents a distinction between the highest, unknowable God, and the Demiurge, "creator" of the material universe. The Gnostics considered the most essential part of the process of salvation to be this esoteric knowledge, in contrast to God's grace as an outlook in their worldview along with faith in the ecclesiastical authority.

In Gnosticism, the biblical serpent in the Garden of Eden was praised and thanked for bringing knowledge (gnosis) to Adam and Eve and thereby freeing them from the malevolent Demiurge's control. Gnostic Christian doctrines rely on a dualistic cosmology that implies the eternal conflict between good and evil, and a conception of the serpent as the liberating savior and bestower of knowledge to humanity opposed to the Demiurge or creator god, identified with Yahweh of the Old Testament. Gnostic Christians considered the Hebrew god of the Old Testament as the evil, false god and creator of the material universe, and the Unknown God of the Gospel, the father of Jesus Christ and creator of the spiritual world, as the true, good god. In the Archontic, Sethian and Ophite systems, Yaldabaoth (Yahweh) is regarded as the malevolent Demiurge and false god of the Old Testament who generated the material universe and keeps the souls trapped in physical bodies, imprisoned in the world full of pain and suffering that he created.

However, not all Gnostic movements regarded the creator of the material universe as inherently evil or malevolent. For instance, Valentinians believed that the Demiurge is merely an ignorant and incompetent creator, trying to fashion the world as good as he can, but lacking the proper power to maintain its goodness. All Gnostics were regarded as heretics by the proto-orthodox Early Church Fathers.

=== Mandaeism ===
In Mandaeism, the concept of manda ("knowledge", "wisdom", "intellect") is roughly equivalent to the Gnostic concept of gnosis. Mandaeism ('having knowledge') is the only surviving Gnostic religion from antiquity. Mandaeans formally refer to themselves as Nasurai (Nasoraeans) meaning guardians or possessors of secret rites and knowledge. The Mandaeans emphasize salvation of the soul through secret knowledge (gnosis) of its divine origin. Mandaeism "provides knowledge of whence we have come and whither we are going."

== Christian usage ==
=== New Testament ===
The New Testament uses the term γνῶσις (Strong's G1108, Transliteration gnōsis) 28 times. Most of this usage is found in Paul's Epistles, which later Gnostics used to develop their distinct concept of gnosis.

=== Patristic literature ===
The Church Fathers, such as Clement of Alexandria, used the word gnosis (knowledge), alongside the word syneidesis (conscience) to mean a spiritual knowledge by which believers could use reason to intuitively discern truth or righteousness. This positive usage was to contrast it with how gnostic sectarians used the word. Cardiognosis ("knowledge of the heart") from Eastern Christianity related to the tradition of the starets and in Roman Catholic theology is the view that only God knows the condition of one's relationship with God. Boston College Catholic philosopher Dermot Moran notes that

...even in early Christianity, matters were complex, such that an anti-gnostic writer like Clement of Alexandria can regularly invoke the notion of gnostike theoria in a positive sense.

=== Eastern Orthodox thought ===
Gnosis in Orthodox Christian (primarily Eastern Orthodox) thought is the spiritual knowledge of a saint (one who has obtained theosis) or divinely-illuminated human being. Within the cultures of the term's provenance (Byzantine and Hellenic) Gnosis was a knowledge or insight into the infinite, divine and uncreated in all and above all, rather than knowledge strictly into the finite, natural or material world. Gnosis is transcendental as well as mature understanding. It indicates direct spiritual, experiential knowledge and intuitive knowledge, mystic rather than that from rational or reasoned thinking. Gnosis itself is gained through understanding at which one can arrive via inner experience or contemplation such as an internal epiphany of intuition and external epiphany such as the theophany.

In the Philokalia, it is emphasized that such knowledge is not secret knowledge but rather a maturing, transcendent form of knowledge derived from contemplation (theoria resulting from practice of hesychasm), since knowledge cannot truly be derived from knowledge, but rather, knowledge can only be derived from theoria (to witness, see (vision) or experience). Knowledge, thus plays an important role in relation to theosis (deification/divinization) and theoria (revelation of the divine, vision of God). Gnosis, as the proper use of the spiritual or noetic faculty plays an important role in Orthodox Christian theology. Its importance in the economy of salvation is discussed periodically in the Philokalia where as direct, personal knowledge of God (noesis) it is distinguished from ordinary epistemological knowledge (episteme—i.e., speculative philosophy).

== Islam ==
=== Sufism ===
Knowledge (or gnosis) in Sufism refers to knowledge of Self and God. The gnostic is called al-arif bi'lah or "one who knows by God". The goal of the Sufi practitioner is to remove inner obstacles to the knowledge of God. Sufism, understood as the quest for Truth, is to seek for the separate existence of the Self to be consumed by Truth, as stated by the Sufi poet Mansur al-Hallaj, who was executed for saying "I am the Truth" (ana'l haqq).

== Jewish usage ==
=== Hellenistic Jewish literature ===
The Greek word gnosis (knowledge) is used as a standard translation of the Hebrew word "knowledge" (דעת da'ath) in the Septuagint, thus:

The Lord gives wisdom [ħokhma] (sophia), from his face come knowledge [da'ath] (gnosis) and understanding [tevuna] (synesis)"

— Proverbs 2.6

Philo also refers to the "knowledge" (gnosis) and "wisdom" (sophia) of God.

== See also ==
- Divine illumination
- Enlightenment in Buddhism
- Gnossiennes
- Gnosticism in modern times
- Gnosiology
- Gnosis (chaos magic)
- Jnana
- Neoplatonism and Gnosticism
- Noema
- Noetic consciousness
- Noetics
- Prajñā (Buddhism)
- Prajna (Hinduism)
- Satori
- Valentinus
