= Divine knowledge =

Divine knowledge may refer to:

- Divine illumination
- Enlightenment in Buddhism
- Kevala jnana
- Omniscience
- Prophecy
