= Georges van Vrekhem =

Georges Van Vrekhem (Wakken, 28 March 1935 – Auroville, 31 August 2012) was a Flemish (i.e. Dutch-speaking) Belgian journalist, poet and playwright, who was the artistic manager of a professional theater company, the "Nederlands Toneel te Gent". He became acquainted with the teachings of Sri Aurobindo and The Mother in 1964. In 1970, he joined the Sri Aurobindo Ashram in Puducherry, and eight years later, in 1978 he moved to Auroville. He has translated as selected writings from the Ramayana and the Mahabharata and several books of Sri Aurobindo, The Mother, Peter Heehs, and Satprem into Dutch. Van Vrekhem died during sleep in his Auroville home in Shakti on 31 August 2012.

== Works ==
His book on the life and work of Sri Aurobindo and The Mother, Voorbij de mens has been published in The Netherlands in 1995, and translated into English as Beyond Man, published in India in 1997, and also translated into French, German, Italian, Spanish and Russian. The American edition, published by Paragon House, is called Beyond the Human Species: The Life and Work of Sri Aurobindo and the Mother. Since then Van Vrekhem has published The Mother - The Story of Her Life (2000), Overman - The Transitional Being between the Human and the Supramental (2000), Patterns of the Present - in the Light of Sri Aurobindo (2002), Hitler and His God - The Background to the Nazi Phenomenon (2006), Evolution, Religion and the Unknown God (2011), Preparing for the Miraculous (2012), and The New Spirituality (2013).

== See also ==
- List of Adolf Hitler books
