= Sujata Nahar =

Hindu writer

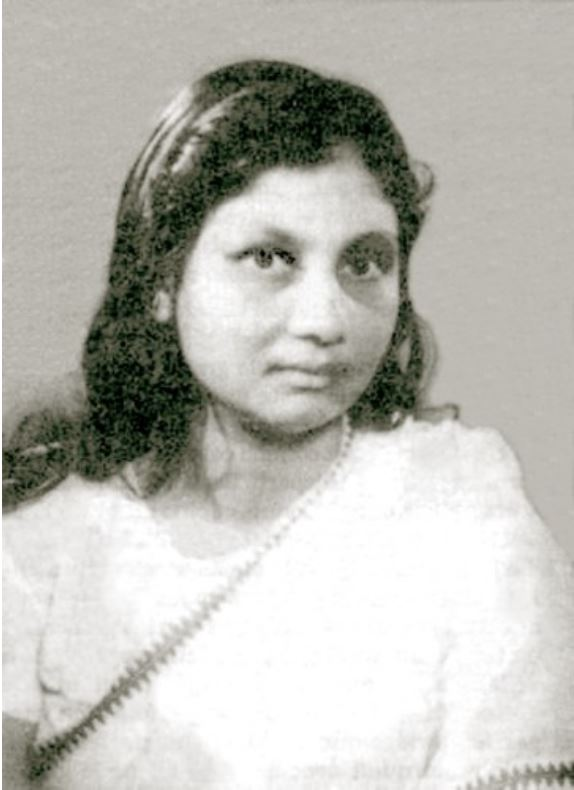
Image of Sujata Nahar

Sujata Nahar (12 December 1925 – 4 May 2007) was born in Calcutta, and spent her formative years near the poet Rabindranath Tagore. At the age of seven, she lost her mother. Her father, searching for another meaning to life, turned to Sri Aurobindo and the Mother. In this way, Sujata also came to Sri Aurobindo in 1935, at age nine. She received private tutoring, and became secretary to Pavitra, the Mother's disciple. She met Satprem in 1954. Later, the Mother entrusted her with the typing up of her private conversations with Satprem, which later became The Agenda. From 1965 to 1973 Sujata regularly accompanied Satprem to his meetings with Mother.

Later, Sujata wrote the popular and well-researched 8-volume biography of The Mother and Sri Aurobindo, Mother's Chronicles. So far, beginning from 1985, six volumes have appeared in English. The books are also being translated into French, German, and several Indian languages.

She died shortly after her companion, Satprem, at age 81.
