= Cosmic Review =

The Cosmic Review, published under the French title Revue Cosmique, was the journal of the Cosmic Movement established by Max Théon around the turn of the twentieth century, at the instigation of his wife Alma Théon, who he declared to be the moving spirit behind this idea.

The Cosmic Review was intended for the "study and re-establishment of the original Tradition", and became the movement's mouthpiece. Its first editor was Charles Barlet; and Théon, under the name of Aia Aziz, was its director. Later Mirra Alfassa took over the role of editor.

The Théons and their students published a number of articles and narratives in the seven years of the Cosmic Review – from January 1902 to December 1908. Following the death of Alma in 1908, Théon suspended production of the magazine.

The Cosmic Review is currently available in French, published by Aken Editions.
