= Nirodbaran =

Nirodbaran (17 November 1903 – 17 July 2006, Pondicherry) or "Nirod" for short, was the personal physician and scribe of Sri Aurobindo, and senior member of the Sri Aurobindo Ashram.

== Life ==
He graduated from the University of Edinburgh with a degree in medicine. He was told about Sri Aurobindo and The Mother by Dilip Kumar Roy while in Paris. In 1930 he visited the Ashram and met the Mother. He then spent 2 or 3 years practising medicine in Burma, but this work failed to satisfy him. He returned to the Ashram with the intention of practising Yoga, and took up work as the resident doctor. He found to his surprise that poetry was one of the vocations taken up by some of the disciples. As Sri Aurobindo had already withdrawn from the public life of the ashram, he communicated with and instructed the sadhaks via letters, and Nirodbaran entered into a voluminous correspondence with Sri Aurobindo (receiving about 4000 letters), who encouraged and guided his attempts at poetry. He published a collection of his poems as Blossom of the Sun and 50 poems by Nirodbaran, which were revised and commented on by Sri Aurobindo.

In November 1938 Sri Aurobindo broke his leg and as a physician Nirodbaran was one of the disciples with medical knowledge who attend him while he recuperated.

Later he had published Talks with Sri Aurobindo (3 volumes), Correspondence with Sri Aurobindo (2 volumes), and his memoir 12 years with Sri Aurobindo, as well as various volumes of poetry and other writings.

Nirodbaran died peacefully on the evening of 17 July 2006 at the Ashram Nursing Home in Pondicherry. He was 102. He was buried at the Ashram's Cazanove Gardens the next day.
