= Manda (Mandaeism) =

Concept of knowledge or gnosis in Mandaeism

In Mandaeism, manda (Classical Mandaic: ࡌࡀࡍࡃࡀ) is the concept of gnosis or spiritual knowledge. Mandaeans stress salvation of the soul through secret knowledge (gnosis) of its divine origin. Mandaeism "provides knowledge of whence we have come and whither we are going."

== Etymology ==
On the basis of cognates in other Aramaic dialects, Semiticists such as Mark Lidzbarski and Rudolf Macúch have translated the term manda as "knowledge" (cf. Imperial Aramaic: מַנְדַּע mandaʻ in Dan. 2:21, 4:31, 33, 5:12; cf. Hebrew: מַדַּע maddaʻ, with characteristic assimilation of /n/ to the following consonant, medial -nd-, hence becoming -dd-). In his 1965 Mandaic handbook, Macúch suggests that due to the special religious use of the word, -n- was added in order to make it unique from other words with the same root.

== Derived terms ==
Mandaeism ('having knowledge') comes from the Mandaic word manda, meaning "knowledge". Mandaean priests formally refer to themselves as Naṣuraia (Nasoraeans), meaning guardians or possessors of secret rites and knowledge.

Mandaia (Classical Mandaic: ࡌࡀࡍࡃࡀࡉࡀ, lit. 'Gnostic, Knower, Enlightened One'; plural: Mandaiia ࡌࡀࡍࡃࡀࡉࡉࡀ) is a Mandaic term that refers to a Mandaean layperson, as opposed to a Naṣuraia (Mandaean priest).

The beth manda (Classical Mandaic: ࡁࡉࡕ ࡌࡀࡍࡃࡀ, romanized: bit manda, lit. 'house of knowledge'), also called a mandi, is a Mandaean building that serves as a community center and place of worship.

The name of the uthra Manda d-Hayyi literally means the manda (gnosis) of Hayyi Rabbi ("The Life"). Manda d-Hayyi is one of the important uthras in Mandaeism, since he revealed himself to John the Baptist and took his soul to the World of Light.

== See also ==
- Gnosis
- Divine spark
- Enlightenment in Buddhism
- Prajñā (Buddhism)
- Prajna (Hinduism)
- Satori in Zen Buddhism
- Neoplatonism and Gnosticism
- Valentinianism § Gnosis
