= Illusory body =

Tibetan Buddhist practice

Illusory body is a term for one of the Six Yogas of Naropa, also called luminosity. In his commentary, Pema Karpo says that the clear light is experienced briefly by all human beings at the very first moment of death, by advanced yogic practitioners in the highest states of meditation, and unceasingly by all Buddhas.

== Definition ==
Luminosity or clear light (Tibetan: འོད་གསལ་, Wylie: 'od gsal, THL: ö-sel; Sanskrit: prabhāsvara), is a central concept in Esoteric Buddhism, Tibetan Buddhism and Bon. It is the innate condition of the mind, associated with buddha-nature, the realisation of which is the goal of meditative practice. It is said to be experienced when the coarse and subtle minds dissolve during deep sleep, during orgasm, and during the death process. All systems of Tibetan Buddhism agree that the clear light nature of mind is non-conceptual and free from all mental afflictions, and that tantra is the superior method of working with this nature of the mind.

Various Vajrayana practices involve the recognition of this aspect of mind in different situations, such as dream yoga. In this case, the practitioner trains to lucidly enter the deep sleep state. If one has the ability to remain lucid during deep sleep, one will be able to recognize the luminosity of death and gain Buddhahood. This is called the meeting of mother and child luminosities, resulting in the state of thukdam at death.

== Description ==
The Indian tantric commentator Indrabhuti, in his Jñanasiddhi, states that

Being luminous by nature, this mind is similar to the moon’s disc. The lunar disc epitomises the knowledge (jñāna) that is luminous by nature. Just as the waxing moon gradually emerges in its fullness, in the same way the mind-jewel (cittaratna), being naturally luminous, also fully emerges in its perfected state. Just as the moon becomes fully visible, once it is freed from the accidental obscurities, in the same way the mind-jewel, being pure by nature (prakṛti-pariśuddha), once separated from the stains of defilements (kleśa), appears as the perfected buddha-qualities (guṇa).

== Practice ==
The practice of the illusory body is a kind of contemplation on the illusory nature (maya) of phenomena. Tilopa's oral instructions state:

All animate and inanimate things of the three worlds are like the examples of an illusion, a dream and so forth. See this at all times, both in movement and in stillness. Contemplate an illusory deity reflected in a mirror; take a drawn image of Vajrasattva, and consider how the reflected image vividly appears. Just as that image is an illusory appearance, so it is with all things. The yogi thus contemplates the twelve similes and sees the reality of how all things are illusory. This is the instruction of [the mahasiddha] Nagarjuna.

=== Gampopa's presentation ===
According to Gampopa's Closely Stringed Pearls, the practice of Illusory Body (sgyu lus, *mayadeha or *mayakaya) is done by assuming a meditative posture and meditating by looking at one's body in a mirror, contemplating how it has an illusory nature. According to Kragh, "He should then speak to himself, voicing many self-criticisms and check whether he feels any unhappiness or expressing praises and see whether he feels pleased. As long as such emotions arise, he has not trained himself sufficiently in the practice. Once no emotion occurs, he should contemplate all appearances of himself and everything else as having a hallucinatory and dream-like quality." Another meditation manual by Gampopa states that one should meditate on reality as being dreamlike before doing the mirror practice.

In a second phase of this practice, a yogi hangs a picture of his chosen deity behind them so that its image appears in a mirror placed in front. Then the yogi scolds or praises the image as his self-reflection and sees if there is any emotional response. When there is no response, the yogi contemplates the illusory (maya) nature of themselves and the reflection, feeling that everything is essenceless like the deity's body. This instruction is said to be a postmeditative practice and thus may have meant to be practiced in-between sessions of regular sitting meditation.

=== Gelug presentation ===
In the Gelug system, to give rise to the illusory body, one must first practice the previous dharmas of generation stage, inner heat, karmamudra, and radiance yoga. One begins by practicing inner heat and karmamudra, then going through the stages of the dissolution of the elements, and meditating until radiance and the four blisses arise. Then one uses this radiant blissful mind to meditate on emptiness and rest single pointedly in that non-conceptual absorption.

Regarding post meditation, Tsongkhapa states that in times of the day when one is not meditation, "one maintains awareness of the vision of emptiness, and recollects the previous meditation on transforming all appearances into the mandala and its deities." This will lead all appearances to arise as illusions.

== See also ==
- Astral body
- Body of light
- Energy being
- Etheric body
- Divine spark
- Luminous mind
- Mindstream
- Subtle body
