= Alma Théon =

Occultist

Alma Théon (born Mary Chrystine Woodroffe Ware or Miriam Lin Woodroffe; 1843–1908) was an occultist and wife and co-worker of Max Théon. According to Max Théon, his wife was the driving force behind the Cosmic Movement or Cosmic Tradition that he taught.

In her Collected Works and occasional references in The Agenda, The Mother (Mirra Alfassa) describes Madame Théon as an extraordinary woman with great powers; and refers to miraculous experiences at Tlemcen in Algeria, where she stayed on two extended visits to learn occultism under the tutelage of the Théons.
