= Body of light =

Hermetic starfire body

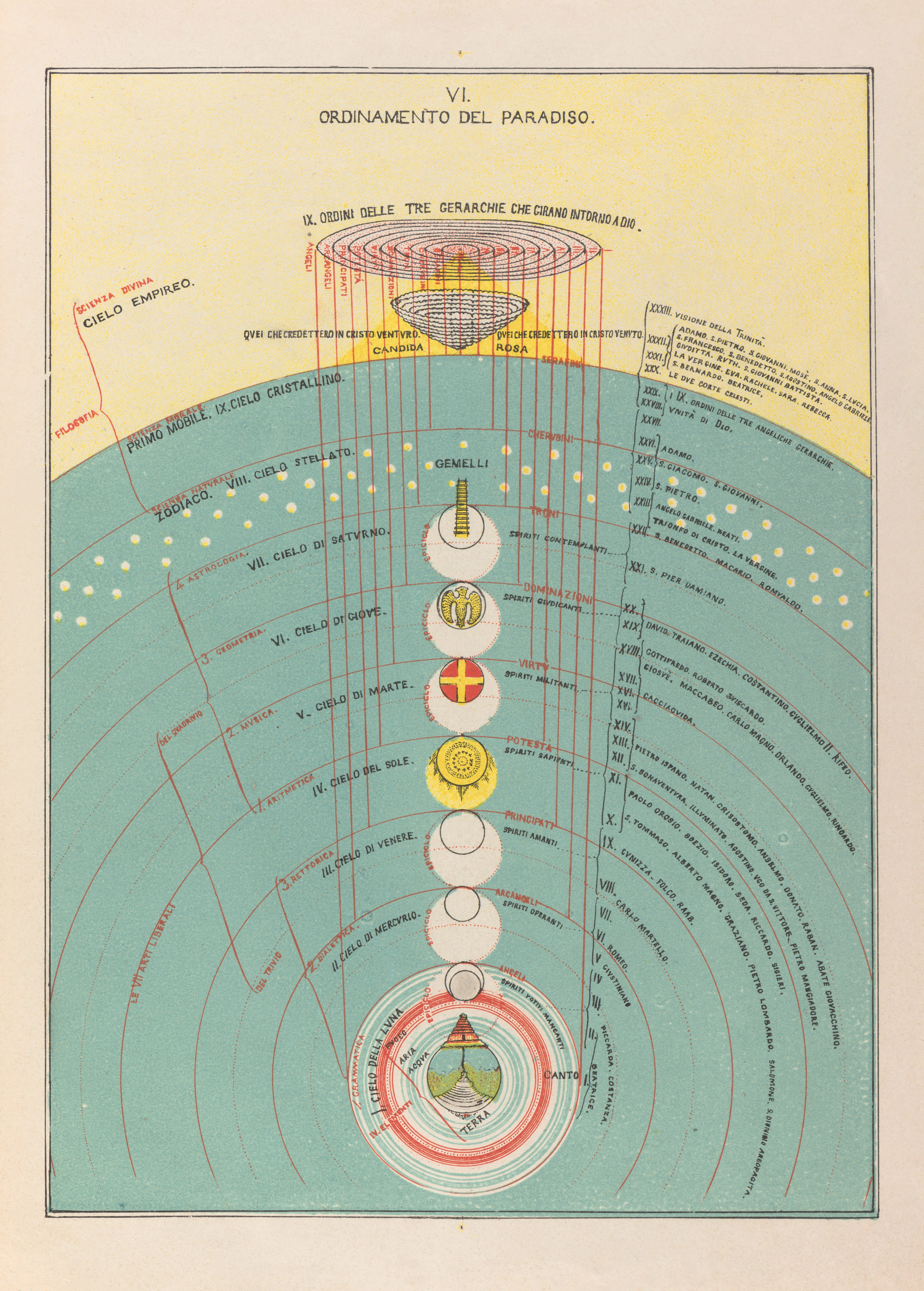
La materia della Divina commedia di Dante Alighieri, Plate VI: "The Ordering of Paradise" by Michelangelo Caetani

The body of light, sometimes called the astral body (Note: n.b., however, that this term may refer instead to the Theosophical concept of the astral body.) or subtle body, (Note: n.b. however, this term may refer instead to the subtle body of Eastern esotericism.) is a "quasi material" aspect of the human body, being neither solely physical nor solely spiritual, posited by a number of philosophers, and elaborated on according to various esoteric, occult, and mystical teachings. Other terms used for this body include body of glory, spirit-body, luciform body, augoeides (radiant body), astroeides (starry or sidereal body), and celestial body.

The concept derives from the philosophy of Plato: the word 'astral' means 'of the stars'; thus the astral plane consists of the Seven Heavens of the classical planets. The idea is rooted in common worldwide religious accounts of the afterlife in which the soul's journey or "ascent" is described in such terms as "an ecstatic, mystical or out-of-body experience, wherein the spiritual traveler leaves the physical body and travels in their body of light into 'higher' realms."

Neoplatonists elaborated on Plato's description of the starry nature of the human psyche. Throughout the Renaissance, philosophers and alchemists, healers including Paracelsus and his students, and natural scientists such as John Dee, continued to discuss the nature of the astral world intermediate between earth and the divine. The concept of the astral body or body of light was adopted by 19th-century ceremonial magician Éliphas Lévi, Florence Farr and the magicians of the Hermetic Order of the Golden Dawn, including Aleister Crowley.

== History ==
Plato and Aristotle taught that the stars were composed of a type of matter different from the four earthly elements - a fifth, ethereal element or quintessence. In the astral mysticism of the classical world the human psyche was composed of the same material, thus accounting for the influence of the stars upon human affairs. In his commentaries on Plato's Timaeus, Proclus wrote;

Man is a little world (mikros cosmos). For, just like the Whole, he possesses both mind and reason, both a divine and a mortal body. He is also divided up according to the universe. It is for this reason, you know, that some are accustomed to say that his consciousness corresponds with the nature of the fixed stars, his reason in its contemplative aspect with Saturn and in its social aspect with Jupiter, (and) as to his irrational part, the passionate nature with Mars, the eloquent with Mercury, the appetitive with Venus, the sensitive with the Sun and the vegetative with the Moon.

Such doctrines were commonplace in mystery-schools, Gnostic and Hermetic sects throughout the Roman Empire, and influenced the early Christian church.

=== Neoplatonism ===
Neoplatonism is a branch of classical philosophy that uses the works of Plato as a guide to understanding religion and the world. In the Myth of Er, particularly, Plato rendered an account of the afterlife which involved a journey through seven planetary spheres and then eventual reincarnation. He taught that man was composed of mortal body, immortal reason and an intermediate 'spirit'. Neoplatonists agreed as to the immortality of the rational soul but disagreed as to whether man's "irrational soul" was immortal and celestial ("starry", hence astral) or whether it remained on earth and dissolved after death.

The early Neoplatonist Porphyry (3rd century) wrote of the Augoeides, a term which is encountered in the literature of Neoplatonic theurgy. The word originates from Ancient Greek and has been interpreted as deriving from ᾠόν, meaning 'egg', or αυγή, meaning 'dawn', combined with 'είδηση', indicative of 'news' or 'a message', or with 'εἴδωλον', an 'idol' or 'reflection'. Thomas Taylor commented on Porphyry's use of the term:

For here he evidently conjoins the rational soul, or the etherial sense, with its splendid vehicle, or the fire of simple ether; since it is well known that this vehicle, according to Plato, is rendered by proper purgation 'augoeides', or luciform, and divine. (Note: Taylor (tr.) in Porphyry (1823).)

Synesius, a 4th-century Greek bishop, according to Isaac Myer equated the divine body with 'Imagination' (phantasia) itself, considering it to be "something very subtle, yet material," referring to it as "the first body of the soul."

Building on concepts described by Iamblichus and Plotinus, the late Neoplatonist Proclus (5th century), who is credited as the first to speak of subtle planes, posited two subtle bodies, vehicles, or 'carriers' (okhema), intermediate between spirit and the physical body. These were:

1. the augoeides okhêma, 'luminous vehicle' or 'body of light', which he identified as the immortal vehicle of the rational soul.
2. the pneumatikon okhêma, 'pneumatic vehicle' or 'body of breath', indwelling the vital breath (pneuma), which he identified as the mortal vehicle of the irrational soul. (cf. pneumatic).

=== Renaissance medicine and magic ===
Marsilio Ficino translated the Corpus Hermetica into Latin. He wrote:

Look at the universal world full of the light of the sun. Look at the light in the world’s matter full of all the universal forms and forever changing. Subtract, I beg you, matter from the light and put the rest aside : suddenly you have soul, that is, incorporeal light, replete with all the forms, but changeable. (Note: Ficino as quoted in Bridgman (2006), p. 237.)

Ficino describes this tenuous form as being of aether or quintessence, the fifth element, spirit, and says that it has a "fiery and starry nature." (Note: Ficino as quoted by Walker (1958b), p. 13.) He also refers to it as the 'astral body,' intermediate between spirit and the body of matter.

Such ideas greatly influenced the Renaissance medicine of Paracelsus and Servetus. John Dee, a student of Ficino, based his natural philosophy on Ficino and the Medieval optical theories of Roger Bacon, William of Ockham, John Peckham, and Vitello; according to Szulakowska "specifically for his ideas concerning the radiation of light rays and the effects of the planetary and stellar influences on the earth." Dee was also influenced by the Arabian philosopher Al-Kindi, whose treatise De radiis stellarum wove together astrology and optical theory, which inspired Dee's Propaedeumata Aphoristica. In Dee's system of Enochian magic, there were three main techniques: invocation (prayer), scrying (crystal-gazing), and traveling in the body of light.

Isaac Newton, despite his renown for his scientific pursuits, studied the occult. In the early 18th century, he speculated that material bodies might be transformed into light, connecting this idea with the 'subtle body' of alchemy.

Franz Anton Mesmer borrowed from Newton's more occult theories with the intention of finding medical applications. He also built on the work of Richard Mead, who hypothesized that due to the astral nature of the human body, it is subject to an "all-pervading gravitation emanating from the stars." Mesmer expanded this concept, hypothesizing that bodies were subject to a form of magnetism emanating from all other bodies, not just the stars, which he called 'animal magnetism,' describing it as a "fluid which is universally widespread and pervasive in a manner which allows for no void, subtly permits no comparison, and is of a nature which is susceptible to receive, propagate, and communicate all impressions of movement." (Note: Mesmer as quoted in Pokazanyeva (2016).) Mesmer's theories influenced the Spiritualist traditions.

Helena Blavatsky wrote of the Augoeides, though her own theories of the astral body were derived from the subtle body traditions of Eastern mysticism.

The most substantial difference consisted in the location of the immortal or divine spirit of man. While the ancient Neoplatonists held that the Augoeides never descends hypostatically into the living man, but only more or less sheds its radiance on the inner man – the astral soul – the Kabalists of the Middle Ages maintained that the spirit, detaching itself from the ocean of light and spirit, entered into man's soul, where it remained through life imprisoned in the astral capsule.

=== Ceremonial magic ===
In the mid-nineteenth century the French occultist Éliphas Lévi introduced the term 'astral light' in his Dogme et rituel de la haute magie (1856), and wrote of it as a factor he considered of key importance to magic, alongside the power of will and the doctrine of correspondences. Lévi developed a full theory of the 'sidereal body' which for the most part agrees with the Neoplatonic tradition of Proclus, Iamblichus, Plotinus, and Porphyry, though he credited Paracelsus as his source. He considered the astral light to be the medium of all light, energy, and movement, describing it in terms that recall both Mesmer and the luminiferous aether.

Lévi's idea of the astral was to have much influence in the English-speaking world due to being adopted by the Hermetic Order of the Golden Dawn and by Aleister Crowley, who believed himself to be Lévi's reincarnation and promoted a number of ideas from his works, including his idea of the true self or True Will, much of his system of ceremonial magic, and his theories of the astral plane and the body of light.

The Hermetic Order of the Golden Dawn, a secret magical order originating in 1888 in Victorian England, describes the subtle body as "the Sphere of Sensation." Florence Farr developed the Golden Dawn education system, succeeded William Wynn Westcott as "Chief Adept in Anglia," and wrote several of the Order's secret instruction papers, called the "Flying Rolls." Farr's writings studied the ten parts of a human being which she said were described in ancient Egyptian writings, including the Sahu, the elemental or astral body; the Tet or Zet, the spiritual body or soul; and the Khaibt, the sphere or aura, radiating from the Sahu, and symbolised by a fan. Farr wrote that the ancient Egyptian adepts "looked upon each body, or manifested being, as the material basis of a long vista of immaterial entities functioning as a spirit, soul and mind in the formative, creative and archetypal worlds." She described how the Khaibt forms a sphere around a human being at birth.

The occultist Israel Regardie published a collection of Golden Dawn magical texts which state that "the whole sphere of sensation which surroundeth the whole physical body of a man is called 'the magical mirror of the universe'. For therein are represented all the occult forces of the universe projected as on a sphere..." Regardie connects the Sephiroth of the Qabalistic Tree of Life to this sphere as a microcosm of the universe. The Kabbalistic concept of the Nephesch ('psyche') is seen as "the subtle body of refined Astral Light upon which, as on an invisible pattern, the physical body is extended."

Aleister Crowley, the founder of the new religious movement Thelema, translated augoeides literally as 'egg message' and connected it with 'the Knowledge & Conversation of the Holy Guardian Angel' or 'higher & original (egg) genius' associated with each human being. He stressed that the body of light must be built up though the use of imagination, and that it must then be animated, exercised, and disciplined. According to Asprem:

The practice of creating a "body of light” in imagination builds on the body-image system, potentially working with alterations across all of its three modalities (perceptual, conceptual, and affective): an idealized body is produced (body-image model), new conceptual structures are attached to it (e.g., the doctrine of multiple, separable bodies), while emotional attachments of awe, dignity, and fear responses are cultivated through the performance of astral rituals and protections from "astral dangers" through the simulation of symbols and magical weapons.

Crowley explains that the most important practices for developing the Body of Light are:

1. The fortification of the Body of Light by the constant use of rituals, by the assumption of god-forms, and by the right use of the Eucharist.
2. The purification and consecration and exaltation of that Body by the use of rituals of invocation.
3. The education of that Body by experience. It must learn to travel on every plane; to break down every obstacle which may confront it.

According to Crowley, the role of the body of light is broader than simply being a vehicle for astral travel—he writes that it is also the storehouse of all experience. (Note: Crowley (1973), ch. 81: "In Magick, on the contrary, one passes through the veil of the exterior world (which, as in Yoga, but in another sense, becomes 'unreal' by comparison as one passes beyond) one creates a subtle body (instrument is a better term) called the body of Light; this one develops and controls; it gains new powers as one progresses, usually by means of what is called 'initiation': finally, one carries on almost one's whole life in this Body of Light, and achieves in its own way the mastery of the Universe.")

== Other uses ==
The term 'body of light' is also used in Tibetan Buddhism, particularly in the Dzogchen and Mahamudra traditions. It is the usual translation of the Tibetan term, ′od lus, also known as the illusory body.

== Meditation research ==
Western scientists have started to explore the subtle body concept in research on meditation. The subtle body model can be cross-referenced onto modern maps of the central nervous system, and applied in research on meditation.

== See also ==
- Ægypt (Note: Although a work of fiction, partially historical, the background concerning the Renaissance traditions surrounding Dee, Kelly, and Bruno are well-researched and presented in this series.)
- Body of resurrection
- Jakob Böhme
- Cake of Light
- Divine illumination
- Divine spark
- Luminiferous aether
- Great Work (Alchemy)
- Great Work (Hermeticism)
- Great Work (Thelema)
- Luminous mind
- Mindstream
- Rainbow body
- Remote viewing
- Saṃbhogakāya
- Scrying
- Spirit body
- Worship of heavenly bodies
