= Max Théon =

Polish Hermetic Kabbalist (1848–1927)

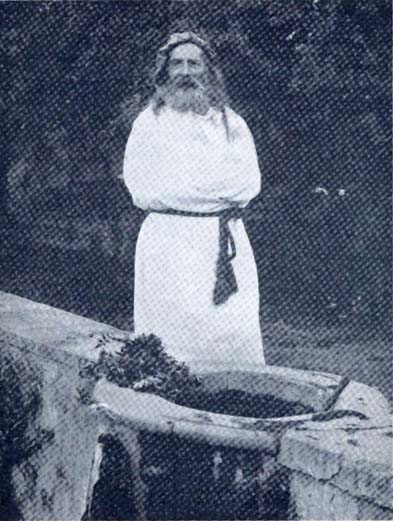
Théon in Algeria

Max Théon (17 November 1848 – 4 March 1927) perhaps born Louis-Maximilian Bimstein, was a Polish Jewish Kabbalist and occultist. In London, he inspired The Hermetic Brotherhood of Luxor in 1884, but seemed to have little to do with the day-to-day running of the organisation, or indeed its actual teachings (Chanel et al., Hermetic Brotherhood of Luxor).

There is some dispute over whether Théon taught Blavatsky at some stage; Mirra Alfassa (The Mother) in The Agenda says he did, Chanel et al. considers this unlikely, while K. Paul Johnson speculates in The Masters Revealed that the Theosophical adept Tuitit Bey might be based on Théon. The Hermetic Brotherhood of Luxor claimed to have originated in Egypt in 1870 and been brought to England by Théon in 1884.

In 1885 Théon married Mary Chrystine Woodroffe Ware (Alma Théon), and the following year the couple moved to Paris. In December 1887, the Théons left France for Algiers, where they were later joined by Alma Théon's friend Augusta Roife (Miss Teresa), and acquired a large estate in Zarif, a suburb of Tlemcen, Algeria. However Théon would still go on frequent visits to Paris.

Théon gathered a number of students, including Louis Themanlys and Charles Barlet, and they established the Cosmic Movement. This was based on material, called the Cosmic Tradition, received or perhaps channelled by Théon's wife. They established the journal Cosmic Review, for the "study and re-establishment of the original Tradition." Théon stated that his wife Alma was the moving spirit behind this idea, and without her the Tradition and the Cosmic Philosophy would never have come about.

Louis was a friend of Matteo Alfassa, the brother of Mirra Alfassa (who would later associate with Sri Aurobindo and take the title The Mother), and in 1905 or 1906 Mirra travelled to Tlemcen to study occultism under Théon (Sujata Nahar, Mirra the Occultist). Alfassa mentions that Sri Aurobindo and Théon had independently and at the same time arrived at some similar conclusions about evolution of human consciousness without having met each other. Alfassa's design of Sri Aurobindo's symbol is very similar to that of Théon's, with only small changes in the proportions of the central square (Mother's Agenda, vol 3, p. 454, dated December 15, 1962).

The death of his wife in 1908 was a huge blow to Théon, from which he never really recovered. He fell into a deep depression, and cancelled the Cosmic Movement. During this time he was cared for by his followers. He recovered somewhat but never retained his former status. Théon died at Tlemcen on 4 March 1927.
