= Okhema =

Link between body and soul in Neoplatonism

Okhêma (Ancient Greek: ὄχημα) refers to the "carrier" or "vehicle" of the soul (okhêma tês psukhês), serving as the intermediary between the body and the soul, in Neoplatonism and the philosophical traditions it influenced.

== Background ==
Neoplatonism is a branch of classical philosophy that uses the works of Plato as a guide to understanding religion and the world. In the Myth of Er, particularly, Plato rendered an account of the afterlife which involved a journey through seven planetary spheres and then eventual reincarnation. He taught that man was composed of mortal body, immortal reason, and an intermediate "spirit". Neoplatonists agreed as to the immortality of the rational soul but disagreed as to whether man's "irrational soul" was immortal and celestial or whether it remained on earth and dissolved after death.

== Proclus ==
Building on concepts described by Iamblichus and Plotinus, the late Neoplatonist Proclus posited two "carriers" of the soul:

1. the augoeides okhêma, or the "luminous vehicle" of the rational soul, which he identified as the immortal vehicle of the soul.
2. the pneumatikon okhêma, or the "pneumatic vehicle" of the irrational soul aligned with the vital breath (pneuma), which he considered mortal.

== Influence ==
The Neoplatonic okhêma was influential to Renaissance occult thought regarding the body of light and 19-century thought regarding the astral body.

== See also ==
- Aristotle's On the Soul
- Plato's theory of soul

== Sources ==
- Dillon, John (1990). "Plotinus, the First Cartesian?". Hermathena (149): 19–31. ISSN 0018-0750. JSTOR 23041171.
- Dodds, E.R. (1963). Proclus: The Elements of Theology. A revised text with translation, introduction, and commentary (2nd ed.).
- Griffin, Michael (2012). "Proclus on Place as the Luminous Vehicle of the Soul". Dionysius. 30: 161–186.
- Plato (2007). The Republic. Translated by Harmondsworth, Desmond Lee (2nd ed.). London: Penguin. ISBN 978-0140455113.
- Shaw, Gregory (2013). "Theurgy and the Platonist's Luminous Body". In DeConick, April; Shaw, Gregory; Turner, John D. (eds.). Practicing Gnosis. pp. 537–557. doi:10.1163/9789004248526_029. ISBN 9789004248526.
