= Pascal Themanlys =

French kabbalist

Pascal Themanlys (27 September 1909 – 25 June 2000) was a French (later Israeli) poet, Zionist, and Kabbalist. His books on Jewish mysticism have been published in French, English and Hebrew.

Pascal was born in Paris; his French parents Louis and Claire Themanlys were important disciples of Max Theon, and in charge of the "Cosmic Movement" in France. Pascal himself only met Theon once in 1920 (when he was eleven, Théon was well into his seventies), although he claimed later he was initiated by his father Louis. This supplemented his own studies of traditional Lurianic Kabbalah.

At fifteen, he published his first collection of poems, work of poems, a booklet called the Emerald Monocle, in 1924. He met a number of important authors and artists such as Rabindranath Tagore and Paul Valéry. In 1934 his book Les merveilles du Becht (Wonders of Becht) was published, the first book in French about the Baal Shem Tov.

During the Second World War he was a member of the French resistance. In 1947, he married his wife, Raymonde; they would later have three children.

In 1949 he emigrated to Israel where he became the head the French section of the Department of Information of the Jewish Agency. He was also the founder of the Amitiés Israël-France (Israel-France Friendship) society.

After his retirement from the civil service he founded the Argaman Center, and taught and studied Kabbalah. He seems to have had a very poor opinion of liberal Judaism.

== Bibliography ==
- Le monocle d’émeraude ("The Emerald Monocle"), foreword by Hélène Vacaresco, Delpeuch, Paris 1924.
- Le Souffleur, illustrated by Mouth, Marcelle Lesage, 1927.
- Figures Passionnées ("Impassioned Figures"), Delpeuch, Paris 1930.
- Les merveilles du Becht ("Wonders of Becht"), Lipschutz, Paris 1934.
- Grands d'Israël, Rieder, Paris 1938.
- Cocktail de Fruits ("Fruit Cocktail"), Beresniak, Paris 1938.
- Détresse et Résistance Juives, M.N.C.R., Grenoble, October 1944.
- Influences, Pro Libro, Paris 1949.
- Max Théon and Cosmic Philosophy, Cosmic library, 1955.
- Un itinéraire de Paris à Jérusalem, Books of Jerusalem, Jerusalem, 1963.
- Shaar Lesodoth Hahitbonenouth (in Hebrew), Argaman, Jerusalem, 1981 .
- In Way of Meditation in the Light of the Kabbala (in English), Argaman, Jerusalem, 1981 .
- Likrat Haboker Hagadol? (in Hebrew), Argaman, Jerusalem, 1982 .
- Si ‘hou Bekhoi Niflotav (conversations with Danièle Storper) (in Hebrew), Argaman, Jerusalem 1987.
- Or ‘Hadash al Tsion (in Hebrew), Argaman, Jérusalem, 1987.
- Visions of the Eternal Present (Selections from the Cosmic Works of Max Theon) - (in English), Argaman, Jerusalem, 1991.
- A l’approche du grand matin Argaman, Jérusalem, 1996.
- Rééditions des Merveilles du Becht : Hebrew : Editions Argaman, Jerusalem, 1999. French: Yerid Hasfarim, 6 rue Mea Shearim Jérusalem, 2000

== External links and references ==
- Pascal Themanlys - biography on Cosmique Review
- Oscar Laurens Schrover 2002 Pathotism is empathy - includes biographical comments
- Pascal Themanlys miscellaneous notes, on Kheper
