= Roger Marston =

Roger Marston (Rogerus de Marston) (died c. 1303) was an English Franciscan scholastic philosopher and theologian.

He studied under John Pecham in Paris, in the years around 1270, and probably also at Oxford a few years later, during the time he was a pupil of John Pecham he was a fellow student with Matthew of Aquasparta. He generally followed Pecham's views on the Eucharist. He regarded time as absolute.

He became Franciscan Provincial in England.
