= Body of resurrection =

Body of resurrection is a typical term of Esoteric Christianity, used to indicate a spiritual body associated with a special enlightenment or experience. Many western and Eastern traditions share a common doctrine on a spiritual and immortal body which represent the ultimate goal of many ascetical works.

== Properties ==
Focusing on the resurrection body, which means a spiritual body in an Esoteric Christian framework, we can find some properties of these bodies which are shared by all the esoteric Christian movements. Indeed according to Biblical Scriptures, the resurrected bodies possess several properties:

- immortality
- entirety, implying the restitution of the limbs, the distinction of the sexes and the perfection of the senses;
- the excellent physique and physical beauty (natural prerogative).
- incorruptibility, freedom from decay, or impassibility, freedom from pain and the passions, deriving from the perfect submission of the body to the soul
- clarity or glory: the bodies of saints will reflect the light, the inner splendor of the soul, therefore, in the body they will conform to the Incarnate Word;
- agility, so that the body of the saint, once free from the natural heaviness (imponderability), will be able to move rapidly from one place to another in the cosmos;
- subtility, the faculty to penetrate everything: the glorious body penetrates, without difficulty nor mutual damage, the other bodies in the Universe.

The resurrection bodies, according to almost all the esoteric Christian currents, will be taken for sure at the end of the time when there will be the resurrection of all the bodies of the dead, good and bad, to be judged by Jesus Christ and receive eternal reward or eternal punishment.

In addition, most esoteric Christian traditions believe that the resurrection body or glorified body can be achieved during this lifetime with special ascetic exercises (which can vary between distinct esoteric movements) or as a supernatural gift.

== Guardian of the Threshold ==
In some modern esoteric Christian and Rosicrucian oriented doctrines the resurrection body is related to the Guardian of the Threshold. Although several authors spoke about both of these elements and sometimes they even relate them together (such as Rudolf Steiner and Max Heindel) the most developed theory explaining the relation between these two entities in a Rosicrucian framework is probably due to Tommaso Palamidessi. In his, The Guardian of the Threshold and the evolutionary way, Palamidessi identifies the spectral entity called the 'lesser Guardian of the Threshold' with the 'archetype of the future resurrection body'.

== See also ==
- Anthroposophy
- Body of light
