= Cosmic Tradition =

Books by Max and Alma Théon

The Cosmic Tradition is a series of six volumes, and also a cosmological doctrine, authored by Max and Alma Théon around the turn of the 20th century. The books, four volumes of which are available on-line in French, tell a creation myth and early human history, in an elaborate mythological style reminiscent of the works of H. P. Blavatsky, Rudolf Steiner (Cosmic Memory), Edgar Cayce, and Ann Ree Colton.

The account of creation at the start of the first volume also incorporates elements of Lurianic Kabbalah.
