= Satprem =

French writer (1923–2007)

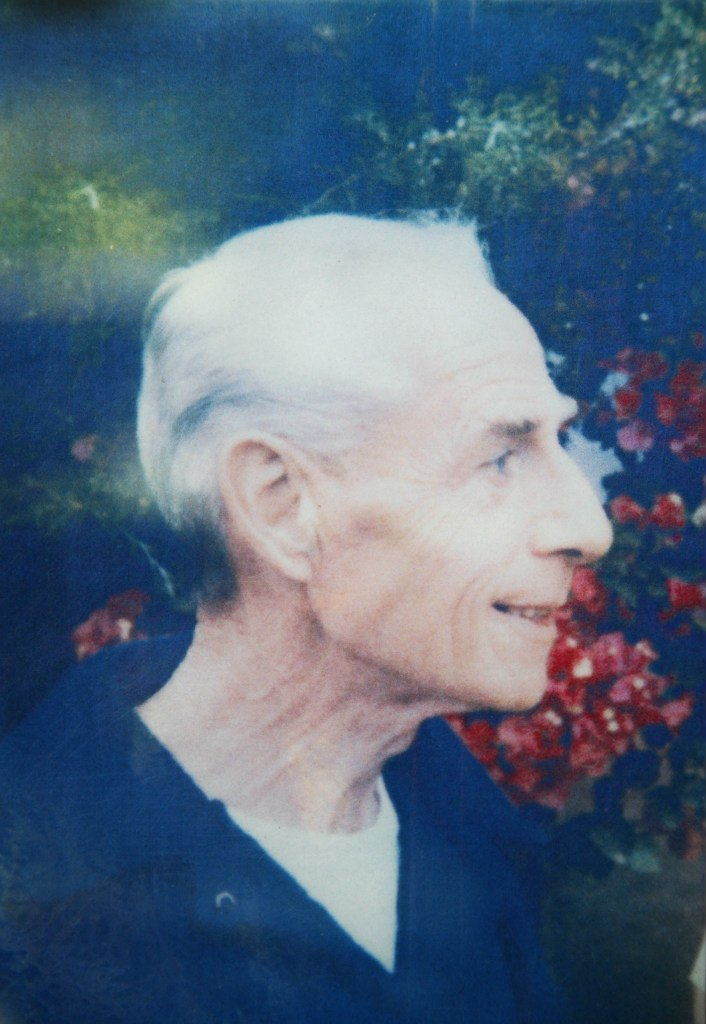
Satprem Rus

Satprem (30 October 1923 – 9 April 2007) was a French author and a disciple of Mirra Alfassa.

== Early life ==
Satprem was born Bernard Enginger in Paris and had a seafaring childhood and youth in Brittany.

During World War II he was a member of the French Resistance (in the "Turma-Vengeance" network). He was arrested by the Gestapo in late 1943 and spent one and a half years in German concentration camps. Scarred by the experience, after the war he became interested in the existentialism of André Gide and André Malraux.

== India, The Mother, and Agenda ==
He travelled to Egypt and then India, where he worked briefly as a civil servant in the French colonial administration of Pondicherry, on the Bay of Bengal. There he discovered Sri Aurobindo and The Mother and their "new evolution". He resigned from the civil service, and went in search of adventure in French Guiana, where he spent a year in the Amazon (the setting for his first novel L'Orpailleur/The Gold Washer), with his copy of Sri Aurobindo's The Life Divine, then Brazil, and after that Africa.

In 1953, aged 30, he returned to India and Pondicherry to put himself at the service of The Mother and settled at the ashram. He taught a little at the ashram school, and was in charge of the French copy for the quarterly Bulletin of the Department of Physical Education which was The Mother's publication, and is still printed in English and French. During this time he met his companion Sujata Nahar.

Enginger then sailed around the world, visiting the Congo, Brasília, Afghanistan, the Himalayas, and New Zealand, before once again returning to the ashram.

On 3 March 1957, The Mother gave him the name Satprem ("the one who loves truly").

Satprem remained restless and dissatisfied for some years, torn between his devotion to The Mother along with Sri Aurobindo's teachings, and his wanderlust, and in 1959 he again left the ashram. He became the disciple of a Tantric lama, a priest of the temple at Rameswaram. Then as the disciple of another yogi he spent six months wandering around India as a mendicant sanyasi practicing Tantra, which formed the basis of his second novel, Par le Corps de la Terre, ou le Sanyassin (By the Body of the Earth or, The Sanyasi).

After this he returned again (as he put it, "the bird flew back once more"), to the Pondicherry Ashram and The Mother, who started inviting him from time to time to her room, originally for work in connection with the Bulletin. As their relationship developed, he asked more questions, and eventually decided to record their conversations, taking a tape-recorder to her room. The result of this collaboration was the 13-volume The Agenda, the first of which covers 1951 to 1960 (and contains Satprem's letters to The Mother during his wandering days), and ends with the year 1973.

Perhaps ninety percent of The Agenda consists of The Mother's explanation of her inner and outer experiences, along with Satprem's comments and questions. A great deal of the conversation involved The Mother's discussions of her ongoing attempt to make the physical transformation; i.e. her quest to have the physical body open to what she believed was a spiritual Force, so illness and death could be overcome; not only for herself, but for all of humanity.

Also, as recorded in Agenda, there were also considerable discussions about disciples and visitors they interacted with, particularly their level of consciousness; about events occurring in the world, such as India's mini-war with China, her connection with Indira Gandhi, and the revolution amongst youth at the time, including the value of LSD; the ongoing plans for and development of Auroville; her startling past experiences as a child, and later as a painter and then as a disciple of occultist Max Theon; her many experiences with Sri Aurobindo, before and after his passing; her experiences with several of the Hindu Gods; her attempt to convert the Church to something higher; and countless other subjects and matters.

It is obvious from Agenda that The Mother had great affection for Satprem. She admired his intellect and understanding of Sri Aurobindo's teachings, and encouraged him in his sadhana, i.e. spiritual development. She also pointed out his deficiencies, including his "grumbler" nature and other wanting attitudes. Likewise, she always encouraged him as an author; often working together on his writings.

Under The Mother's guidance he wrote Sri Aurobindo, ou l'Aventure de la Conscience (Sri Aurobindo, or the Adventure of Consciousness), which became the most popular introductory book to Sri Aurobindo and The Mother (published 1964). In 1972 and 1973 he wrote, under The Mother's guidance, the essay La Genèse du Surhomme (On the Way to Supermanhood), which she regarded very highly. This was published in 1974.

== Passing of The Mother ==
Satprem relates that on 19 May 1973, six months before The Mother's death, he was barred admission to her room, the beginning of a serious falling out between the Ashram leadership and himself. Moreover, Satprem and his followers believe there is evidence in the recorded audiotapes that The Mother did not actually die but rather entered a "cataleptic trance" or state of suspended animation in which there would not even be a detectable heartbeat. Satprem recorded a famous conversation between The Mother and Pranab which made Satprem conclude that several ashram sadhaks did not want The Mother to continue her life. However, Pranab has argued that on the contrary he was very much concerned about The Mother's health and that he had received precise instructions from her as to what to do when she appeared to have left her body. These instructions, he says, were exactly followed before she was buried in the second chamber of Sri Aurobindo's Samadhi in the Ashram courtyard under the Service tree, which she herself prepared after Sri Aurobindo's departure in December 1950.

Georges Van Vrekhem disagrees with Satprem's claim that The Mother's work was cut short in those last six months, and argues instead that she did indeed attain a Supramental body and what remained was the residue, like the empty cocoon of a caterpillar after it has become a butterfly.

== Writing and publishing ==
After The Mother's death, all of Satprem's correspondence from 1962 to 1973 with The Mother was confiscated, and he fled with the tapes of The Agenda to Auroville, where, at the age of 50, he edited the 13 volumes of The Agenda while at the same time writing the trilogy Mère (Mother) - Le Matérialisme Divin (The Divine Materialism), L'Espèce Nouvelle (The New Species), La Mutation de la Mort (The Mutation of Death) - both a biography of the Mother and his own analyses and commentary on The Agenda material.

Satprem became a rallying point for the community shocked by the attitude the ashram leaders had taken. His one-man revolt against the Ashram leadership began in 1974, and involved two issues. One was his wish to publish, unexpurgated, the entire transcript of his talks with the Mother. He saw the resistance of the ashram trustees and elders in this regard as symptomatic of the way they had directed the ashram from 1962 onwards. The other was his claim that under the current leadership the Yoga had become institutionalised and dogmatic, like the yogas of the past. For their part, the elders wished to publish the transcripts, but only in edited form. And where Satprem saw conservatism and dogmatism, they saw a loyal commitment to their gurus to uphold the original truth of their teachings.

During this time, Satprem was looked to by the French-speaking Aurovillians as the successor and inheritor of Sri Aurobindo and the Mother's work, and a number of radicals were drawn to him because of his revolt against the ashram elders.

After numerous unsuccessful attempts to get the 13 volumes of The Agenda published by the ashram, Auroville, and Sri Aurobindo Society presses, Satprem founded the Institut de Recherches Évolutives (Institute for Evolutionary Research) in Paris in July 1977 as a non-profit organisation to do so."

Soon after, there was an allegation of an assassination attempt against him in August 1976, and in December 1977 (or 1978) the ashram trustees "expelled" him for "anti-ashram activities" as he attempted to publish The Agenda, and he became persona non grata in the ashram. Satprem and Sujata left Puducherry in 1978.

In 1980 Satprem wrote Le Mental des Cellules (The Mind of the Cells), a synopsis and introduction of the whole of The Agenda, focusing on the Mother's attempt to make the cells responsive to a supramental force, so their inner programming could be altered so as not to automatically fall into illness, decay, and death–the ultimate physical goal of Sri Aurobindo's Integral (Purna) Yoga.

In 1982 all 13 volumes of The Agenda were published in French, and Satprem felt he had completed all his external work. The following year, he and Sujata decided to withdraw completely from public life to devote themselves exclusively to Sri Aurobindo's and The Mother's work of the transformation of the cellular consciousness of the body and realisation of the new evolution, and the search for the "great passage" in the evolution beyond Man. The 1985 book La Vie sans Mort (Life without Death) is a follow-up to Mind of the Cells, co-written with Luc Venet, and provides a glimpse of Satprem in his post-Ashram life in this period.

After seven years, Satprem emerged and began producing a steady stream of books on his experiences, Sri Aurobindo and the Mother's teachings, and the future evolution of Man. In 1989, he wrote La Révolte de la Terre (The Revolt of the Earth), in which he describes his years "digging" in the body. This was followed in 1992 by Evolution II, where he asks "After Man, who? But the question is: After Man, how?"

In 1994 came his Lettres d'un Insoumis (Letters of a Rebel), two volumes of autobiographical correspondence. In 1995, he wrote La Tragédie de la Terre - de Sophocle à Sri Aurobindo (The Tragedy of the Earth - from Sophocles to Sri Aurobindo), an urgent message for mankind to take action against the cycle of death. This was followed in 1998 by La Clef des Contes (The Key of Tales), and in 1999 by "Néanderthal Regarde”(“Neanderthal Looks On”), an essay on the betrayal of Man in India as in the West. In 2000 followed La Légende de l'Avenir (The Legend of the Future) and in 2002 Mémoires d'un Patagonien - Conte Préhistorique et Posthistorique (Memoires of a Patagonian - Prehistoric and Posthistoric Tale) and La Philosophie de l'Amour (The Philosophy of Love). In 2008, the IRE published his last book, L'Oiseau Doël (The Doël Bird).

In 1999, Satprem also started the publication of his Carnets d'un Apocalypse/Notebooks of an Apocalypse (in French, seven volumes published to date, in English only the first volume, 1973-1978, dealing with the years and his experiences immediately after the passing of The Mother), which records his work in the depths of the body consciousness.

== Death ==
Satprem died on April 9, 2007, at the age of 83. His companion Sujata Nahar died after him on May 4, 2007.

== Partial bibliography ==
- The Goldfinder (1964)
- Satprem (1964) (2000, 2nd edition) Sri Aurobindo or the Adventure of Consciousness Mira Aditi, Mysore, & The Mother's Institute of Research, New Delhi
- Satprem (ed.) Mother's Agenda (1982) Institut de Recherches Evolutives, Paris, & Mira Aditi, Mysore (13 vol set)
- Satprem (1982, 1999) The Mind of the Cells Institut de Recherches Evolutives, Paris, & Mira Aditi, Mysore
- Satprem (2002) On the Way to Supermanhood Mira Aditi, Mysore, & The Mother's Institute of Research, New Delhi
- Satprem (1992), Evolution II Institut de Recherches Evolutives, Paris, & Mira Aditi, Mysore
- Satprem (1998), The Revolt of the Earth Institut de Recherches Evolutives, Paris, & Mira Aditi, Mysore
- Satprem (1998), The Tragedy of the Earth Institut de Recherches Evolutives, Paris, & Mira Aditi, Mysore
- Satprem (1981), My Burning Heart, Ingram, Tennessee
- Notebooks of an Apocalypse (1973/2007) 24 volumes
- Veda and Human Destiny (1961)
- The Great Sense (1969)
- Sri Aurobindo and the Future of the Earth (1971)
- Neanderthal looks on (1999)
- The Philosophy of Love (2002)
- The Legend of Tomorrow (2000)
