= John Peckham =

Archbishop of Canterbury from 1279 to 1292

- Archbishop of Canterbury
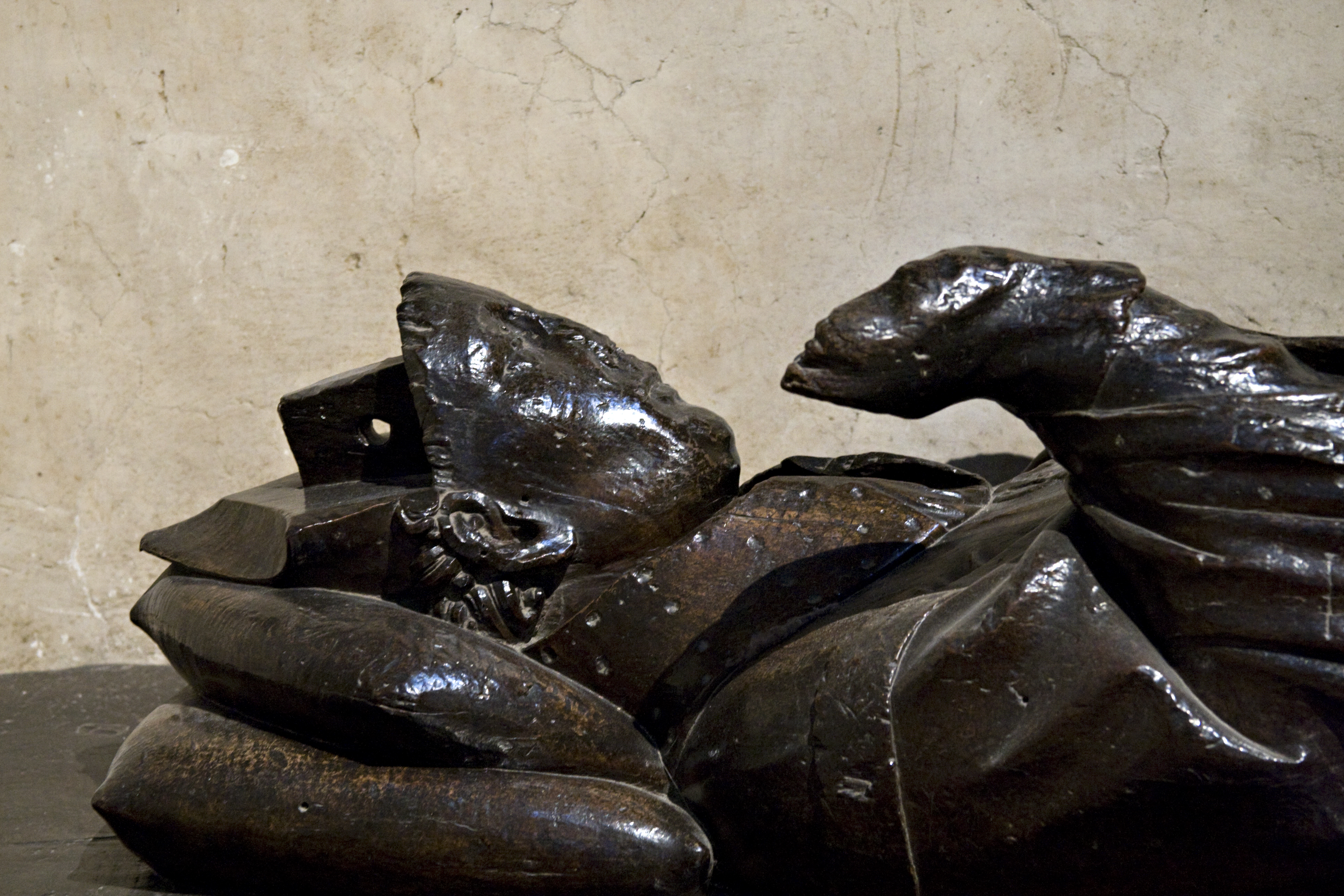
- Effigy from Peckham's tomb in Canterbury Cathedral
- Appointed: 25 January 1279
- Term ended: 8 December 1292
- Predecessor: Robert Kilwardby
- Successor: Robert Winchelsey

Orders
- Consecration: 19 February 1279 by Pope Nicholas III

Personal details
- Born: c. 1230
- Died: 8 December 1292 Mortlake, Surrey, Kingdom of England
- Buried: Canterbury Cathedral
- Denomination: Catholic

John Peckham (Note: Pronounced /ˈpɛkəm/. His last name is also spelled Pecham.) (c. 1230 – 8 December 1292) was a Franciscan friar and Archbishop of Canterbury in the years 1279–1292.

Peckham studied at the University of Paris under Bonaventure, where he later taught theology and became known as a conservative opponent of Thomas Aquinas, especially regarding the nature of the soul. Peckham also studied optics and astronomy – his studies in those subjects were particularly influenced by Roger Bacon and Alhazen. Around 1270, Peckham returned to England, where he taught at the University of Oxford, and was elected the Franciscans' provincial minister of England in 1275. After a brief stint in Rome, he was appointed Archbishop of Canterbury in 1279. His time as archbishop was marked by efforts to improve discipline in the clergy as well as reorganize the estates of his see. He served King Edward I of England in Wales.

As archbishop, Peckham oversaw attempts to close down Jewish synagogues, punish relapsing Jews from "returning to their vomit", and associate with Christians. He also opposed the loaning of money at interest and criticised Queen Eleanor of Castile for purchasing and abusing these loans to dispossess nobles of their property. (Note: The Crown, by overtaxing the Jewish community, forced Jewish moneylenders to sell their loan bonds at great discounts, allowing Eleanor and other courtiers to profit greatly from their purchase.)

Before and during his time as archbishop, Peckham wrote several works on optics, philosophy, and theology, as well as writing hymns. Numerous manuscripts of his works survive. On his death, his body was buried in Canterbury Cathedral, but his heart was given to the Franciscans for burial.

== Early life ==
Peckham came from a humble family, possibly from Patcham in East Sussex. He was born about 1230 and was educated at Lewes Priory. About 1250, he joined the Franciscan order at Oxford. He then went to the University of Paris, where he studied under Bonaventure and became regent master, or official lecturer, in theology. While at Paris, he wrote a Commentary on Lamentations, which sets out two possible sermons.

For years Peckham taught at Paris, where he was in contact with many of the leading scholars of his time, including Thomas Aquinas. He famously debated Thomas on at least two occasions during 1269 and 1270, during which Peckham defended the conservative theological position, and Thomas put forth his views on the soul. The Thomist doctrine of the unity of form was condemned after these debates. His theological works later were used by his pupil Roger Marston who in turn inspired Duns Scotus.

Peckham also studied other fields, however, and was guided by Robert Grosseteste and Roger Bacon's views on the value of experimental science. Where Peckham met Bacon is not known, but it would have been at either Paris or Oxford. Bacon's influence can be seen in Peckham's works on optics (the Perspectiva communis) and astronomy. In the field of optics, Peckham was influenced by Euclid, Pseudo-Euclid, Aristotle, Augustine, al-Kindi, Avicenna, Alhazen, Robert Grosseteste, and Roger Bacon. Of these, historian David Lindberg argues, "Alhazen is by far the most significant, and Peckham could speak of his intention to 'follow in the footsteps' of the author".

== Return to England ==
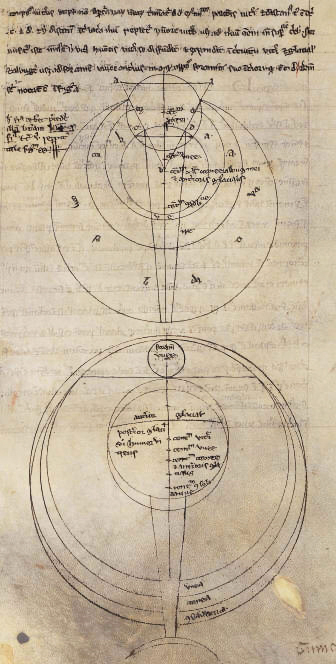
A manuscript of Roger Bacon's work on optics, which influenced Peckham's own works

=== Reorganization of the archdiocese ===
About 1270, he returned to England to teach at Oxford and was elected provincial minister of the Franciscans in England in 1275. He did not long remain in that post, being summoned to Rome as lector sacri palatii, or theological lecturer at the papal palace. It is likely that he composed his Expositio super Regulam Fratrum Minorum, a work that included information on preaching, a subject that Peckham felt was of great importance. In 1279 he was appointed Archbishop of Canterbury by Pope Nicholas III who had prohibited the election of Robert Burnell, Edward I's preferred candidate. He was provided (appointed by the pope to the see) on 25 January 1279 and consecrated on 19 February 1279.

Peckham laid stress on discipline, which often resulted in conflict with his clergy. His first episcopal act was calling a council at Reading in July 1279 to implement ecclesiastical reform, but Peckham's specifying that a copy of Magna Carta should be hung in all cathedral and collegiate churches offended the king as an unnecessary intrusion into political affairs. Another ruling was on the non-residence of clergy in their livings. The only exception Peckham was prepared to make on non-residence was if the clerk needed to go abroad to study. At the Parliament of Winchester in 1279, the archbishop compromised and Parliament invalidated any regulation of the council dealing with royal policies or power. The copies of Magna Carta were taken down. One reason the archbishop may have backed down was that he was in debt to the Italian banking family of the Riccardi, who also were bankers to Edward and the pope, and Peckham was under threat of excommunication from the pope unless he repaid the loans.

However, Peckham worked hard to reorganise the estates of the diocese and held an inquiry in 1283 through 1285 into the revenues of the see. He set up administrative structures in the manors that divided them into seven administrative groups. Peckham, though, was almost continually in debt, and because he was a Franciscan, he had no personal property to help with his living expenses. He had inherited the diocesan debts that his predecessor had allowed to accumulate, and never managed to clear them.

=== Relations with the Welsh ===
Notwithstanding his other actions, Peckham's relations with the king were generally good, and Edward sent him on a diplomatic mission to Llywelyn ap Gruffudd in Wales. In 1282, he attempted to mediate between the Welsh and King Edward, but given that Edward would not budge on the main issues, it was a hopeless mission. In the end, Peckham excommunicated some of the Welsh who were resisting Edward. In service to King Edward, Peckham formed a low opinion of the Welsh people and laws. Peckham visited the Welsh dioceses as part of his tour of all his subordinate dioceses. While there, Peckham criticised the Welsh clergy for their unchaste lives, conspicuous consumption, and heavy drinking. He also found the Welsh clergy to be uneducated, although he did order a Welsh-speaking suffragan bishop to be appointed to help with pastoral duties in the diocese of Coventry and Lichfield. Peckham also criticised the Welsh people as a whole, contrasting their pastoral economy with the farming-based economy of England, and finding the Welsh to be lazy and idle.

As part of his diplomatic duties, Peckham wrote to Llywelyn, and in those letters, the archbishop continued his criticisms of the Welsh people, this time condemning their laws as contrary to both the Old and New Testaments. Peckham was particularly offended that Welsh laws sought to get parties to homicides or other crimes to settle their differences rather than the process of English law, which condemned the criminal.

Peckham also had problems with his subordinate Thomas Bek, who was Bishop of St David's in Wales. Bek tried to revive a scheme to make St David's independent from Canterbury and to elevate it to metropolitan status. This had originally been put forth by Gerald of Wales around 1200, but had been defeated by the actions of Hubert Walter, then the Archbishop of Canterbury. Bek did not manage even the four-year fight that Gerald had managed, for Peckham routed him quickly.

=== Ecclesiastical matters ===
Skirmishes with Edward over clerical privileges, royal power, Peckham's use of excommunication, and ecclesiastical taxation continued, but in October 1286, Edward issued a writ entitled Circumspecte Agatis which specified what types of cases the ecclesiastical courts could hear. These included moral issues, matrimonial issues, disputes about wills and testaments, the correction of sins, and slander and physical attacks on the clergy.

Peckham was very strict in his interpretations of canon law. He felt that Welsh laws were illogical and conflicted with Biblical teachings. He also mandated that the clerical tonsure worn by the clergy should not just include the top of the head, but also have the nape and over the ears shaved, which allowed the clergy to be easily distinguished from the laity. To help with this, the archbishop also forbade the clergy from wearing secular clothing, especially military garb. He also forbade an effort by the Benedictine order in England to reform their monastic rule, to allow more time for study and for more education for the monks. Peckham's reason was that they were against custom, but he may also have had concerns that these reforms would have drawn recruits away from the Franciscans.

At an ecclesiastical council held at Lambeth in 1281, Peckham ordered the clergy to instruct their congregations in doctrine at least four times a year. They were to explain and teach the Articles of Faith, the Ten Commandments, the Works of Mercy, the Seven Deadly Sins, the Seven Virtues and the Sacraments. This command was issued as a canon, or law, of the council, and the group is known as the Lambeth Constitutions. Even later these constitutions were collected as the Ignorantia sacerdotum. The six doctrines comprised the minimum theological knowledge the archbishop considered necessary for the laity to know. The constitutions, which were originally in Latin, were the basis and inspiration for pastoral and devotional works throughout the remainder of the Middle Ages, and were eventually translated into English in the 15th century.

The crime of "Pluralism", which was one cleric holding two or more benefices, was one of Peckham's targets, as were clerical absenteeism and laxity in the monastic life. His main method of fighting these was a system of visitation of his subordinate dioceses and religious houses, which he used with an unprecedented frequency. This often resulted in conflicts over whether or not the archbishop had jurisdiction to conduct these visits, but Peckham was also papal legate, which added a layer of complexity to the resulting disputes. The numerous legal cases that resulted from his visitation policy strengthened the archiepiscopal court at the expense of the lower courts. Peckham also fought with Thomas de Cantilupe, Bishop of Hereford over the right to visit subordinate clergy. The quarrel involved an appeal over the jurisdiction of the archbishop, which Thomas sent to Rome in 1281, but Thomas died before the case could be decided. Peckham also decreed that the clergy should preach to their flocks at least four times a year.

Peckham often was in conflict with his subordinate bishops, mainly because of his efforts to reform them, but Peckham's own attitude and handling of his clergy contributed to the problem. He once wrote to Roger de Meyland, the Bishop of Coventry and Lichfield, "These things need your attention, but you have been absent so long that you seem not to care. We therefore order you, on receipt of this letter, to take up residence in your diocese, so that—even if you are not competent to redress spiritual evils—you may at least minister to the temporal needs of the poor." The historian Richard Southern says that Peckham's disputes with his suffragan bishops were "conducted in an atmosphere of bitterness and perpetual ill-will", which probably owed something to a "petulant strain in Peckham's character". Peckham's conflicts started because his own ideals were those of a Franciscan, but most of his clergy were concerned with more mundane and materialistic affairs. These strains between the archbishop and his subordinates were intensified by clashes over ecclesiastical and secular authority, as well as Edward's great need for income.

=== Measures against the Jews ===
Like many other senior church leaders of the time, Peckham was hostile to the Jews and regarded them as a danger to Christians. He pushed for greater segregation of Jews from Christians, alongside other contemporary church leaders, including Richard de Gravesend and Richard Swinefield, a number of whom had previously worked alongside Simon de Montfort. He sought to eradicate usury and to stop Jewish converts from returning to Judaism.

On hearing that the Jews of London were being allowed to build a new Synagogue, "to the confusion of the Christian religion", Peckham lobbied to stop it. On 19 August 1282, he ordered Richard Gravesend, Bishop of London, to compel the Jews of London, using every instrument of ecclesiastical censure, to destroy all their synagogues except one within a brief time period to be determined by the Bishop, claiming that the seven Synagogues they had were "cheating the Christian religion and causing scandal to many". In a second letter, he congratulates the Bishop because the Judaica perfidia is being overcome by the bishop's attention and vigilance. He confirmed, however, that they should be allowed one Synagogue.

In 1281, Peckham complained to Edward that converts to Christianity were backsliding, saying that those "who had converted from the Jewish perfidy to the Christian religion have returned to their vomit, the Jewish superstition". The following year he reported 17 Jewish apostates, and in 1284, Edward gave him a writ for 13 of them to be arrested. They took refuge in the Tower of London, and Robert Burnell refused to take action for fear of endangering relations with the London Jewry; the 13 seem to have escaped punishment. This, however, was following a pattern set by Peckham's superiors; the Pope had been complaining for some time about similar instances.

Peckham also clashed with Queen Eleanor, stating to her that her use of loans from Jewish moneylenders to acquire lands was usury and a mortal sin. He warned her servants that: "It is said that the illustrious lady queen, whom you serve, is occupying many manors, lands, and other possessions of nobles, and has made them her own property – lands which the Jews have extorted with usury from Christians under the protection of the royal court."

In Easter 1285, the prelates (senior church leaders) of the Province of Canterbury under Peckham's leadership drew up complaints to Edward, two of which were regarding what they saw as lax restrictions on Jews. They complained about converts lapsing back to Judaism, and called for a crackdown on usury, which, although banned since 1275 under the Statute of the Jewry, they believed was still being practiced, asking that "the Jews' fraud and malice be vigorously opposed". Edward replied that there was little that could be done, "because of their evilness". In response, the prelates expressed their shock and stated that the Crown was permitting Jews to "ensnare Christians through usurious contracts and to acquire the manors of nobles through the sink of usury". Edward was, they said, capable of stopping this "perversity", and advised that "through the threat of horrible punishments, which our lips will not name, he may strive to punish all userers".

These concerns were reiterated directly to Peckham in a letter from the Pope Honorius IV, in November 1286, which Peckham and other church leaders used as guidance to make further calls against the Jews in the 1287 Synod of Exeter, again demanding the wearing of Jewish badges, banning Christians from working for Jews, from sharing meals with them, or using Jewish doctors. Jews were to be banned from holding public office, or building new synagogues, and were to stay within their own homes on Good Friday.

== Death and legacy ==
A number of manuscripts of Peckham's works on philosophy and biblical commentary remain extant. Queen Eleanor persuaded him to write for her a scholarly work in French, which was later described as "unfortunately rather a dull and uninspired little treatise." His poem Philomena is considered one of the finest poems written in its time.

Peckham died on 8 December 1292 at Mortlake and was buried in the north transept, or the Martyrdom, of Canterbury Cathedral. His heart, however, was buried with the Franciscans under the high altar of their London church, Greyfriars, London. His tomb still survives. He founded a college at Wingham, Kent in 1286, probably a college of canons serving a church.

== Works ==
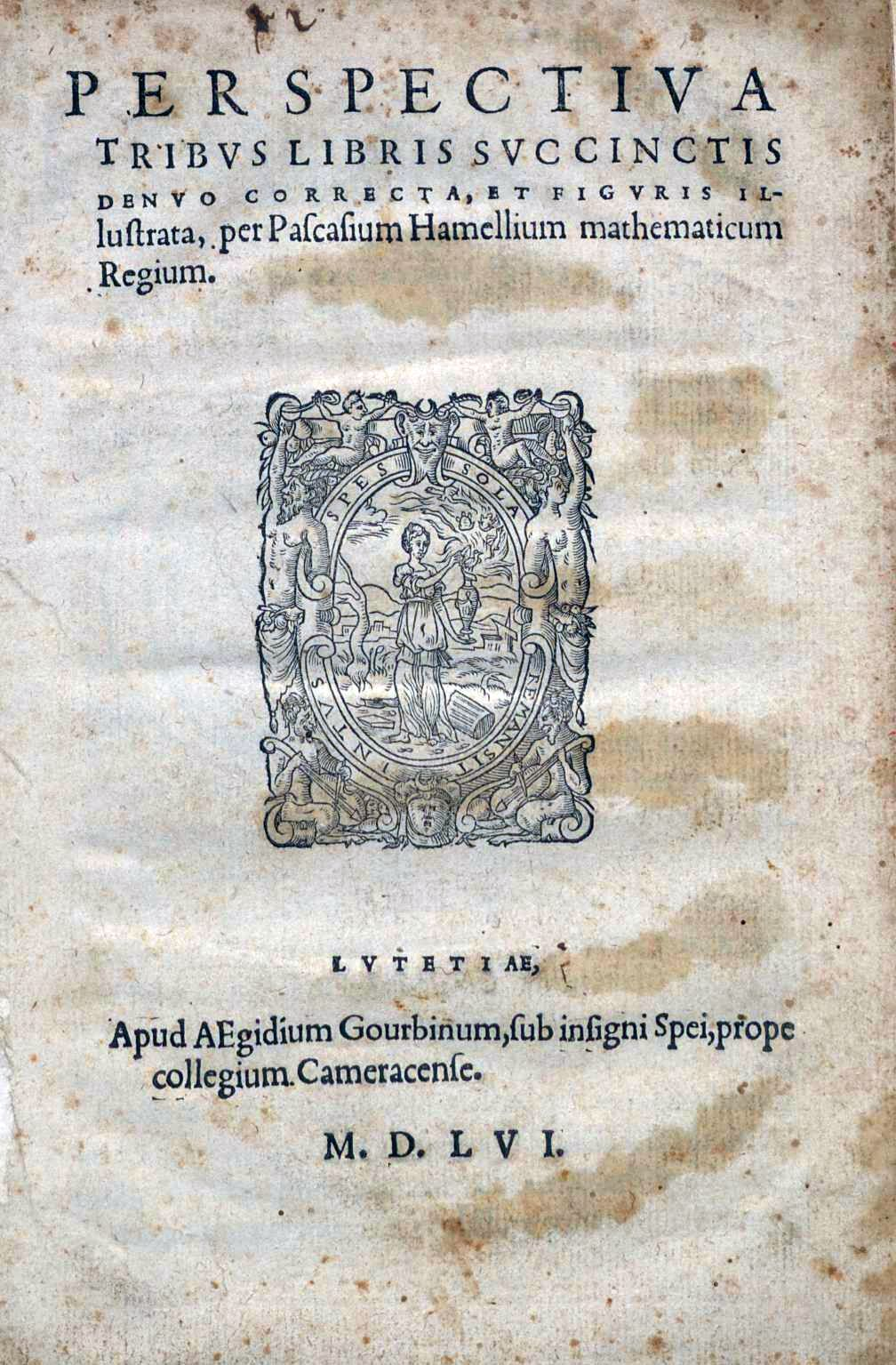
Perspectiva, 1556

A number of his works have survived, and some have appeared in print in various times:

- Perspectiva (in Latin). Paris: Gilles Gourbin. 1556.
- Perspectiva (in Italian). Venezia: eredi Giovanni Varisco. 1593.
- Perspectiva communis
- Collectarium Bibliae
- Registrum epistolarum
- Tractatus de paupertate
- Divinarum Sententiarum Librorum Biblie
- Summa de esse et essentia
- Quaestiones disputatae
- Quodlibeta
- Tractatus contra Kilwardby
- Expositio super Regulam Fratrum Minorum
- Tractatus de anima
- Tractatus de sphaera
- Canticum pauperis
- De aeternitate mundi
- Defensio fratrum mendicantium

Peckham is the earliest Archbishop of Canterbury to have his registers, the principal records of archiepiscopal administration, held at Lambeth Palace Library.

== See also ==
- List of Roman Catholic scientist-clerics

== Citations ==
Catholic Church titles
Preceded by Robert Burnell	Archbishop of Canterbury; 1279–1292	Succeeded by Robert Winchelsey
