= Mirra Alfassa =

French-Indian spiritual guru (1878–1973)

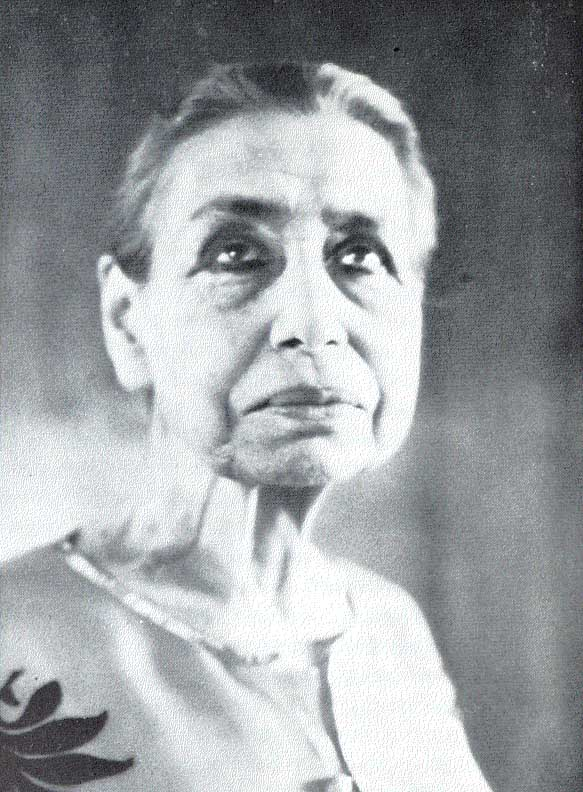
- The Mother

Personal life
- Born: Blanche Rachel Mirra Alfassa; 21 February 1878 Paris, France
- Died: 17 November 1973 (aged 95) Pondicherry, India
- Resting place: Pondicherry, India
- Spouse: Henri Morriset (1897–1956)
- Notable work(s): Prayers And Meditations, Words of Long Ago, On Thoughts and Aphorisms, Words of the Mother
- Pen name: The Mother

Religious life
- Religion: Judaism
- Institute: Sri Aurobindo Ashram; Auroville

Jewish leader
- Students: Satprem, Nolini Kanta Gupta, Nirodbaran, Amal Kiran, Pavitra

Mirra Alfassa (21 February 1878 – 17 November 1973), known to her followers as The Mother or La Mère, was a French-Indian spiritual guru, occultist and yoga teacher, and a collaborator of Sri Aurobindo, who considered her to be of equal yogic stature to him and called her by the name "The Mother" or "Shri Maa".

Alfassa was born in Paris in 1878 to a bourgeois Sephardi Jewish family from Turkey. In her youth, she traveled to Algeria to practice occultism along with the occultist Max Théon. After returning to Paris, Alfassa guided a group of spiritual seekers. In 1914, she traveled to Pondicherry, India, and met Sri Aurobindo. She identified him as "the dark Asiatic figure" of her visions, and called him Krishna. During this first visit, she helped publish a French version of the periodical Arya, which serialised most of Sri Aurobindo's post-political prose writings.

In 1920, after living in Japan for four years, Alfassa returned to Pondicherry where she developed and managed the Sri Aurobindo Ashram. In 1943, she started a school in the ashram, and in 1968 she established Auroville, an experimental township dedicated to human unity and evolution. She died in Pondicherry in 1973.

A 13-volume biography, Mother's Agenda, written by Satprem (one Alfassa's followers) was published in 1979.

== Early life ==
=== Childhood ===
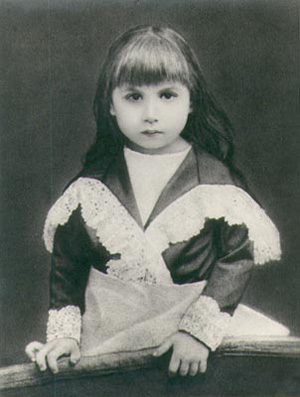
Mirra Alfassa as a child c. 1885

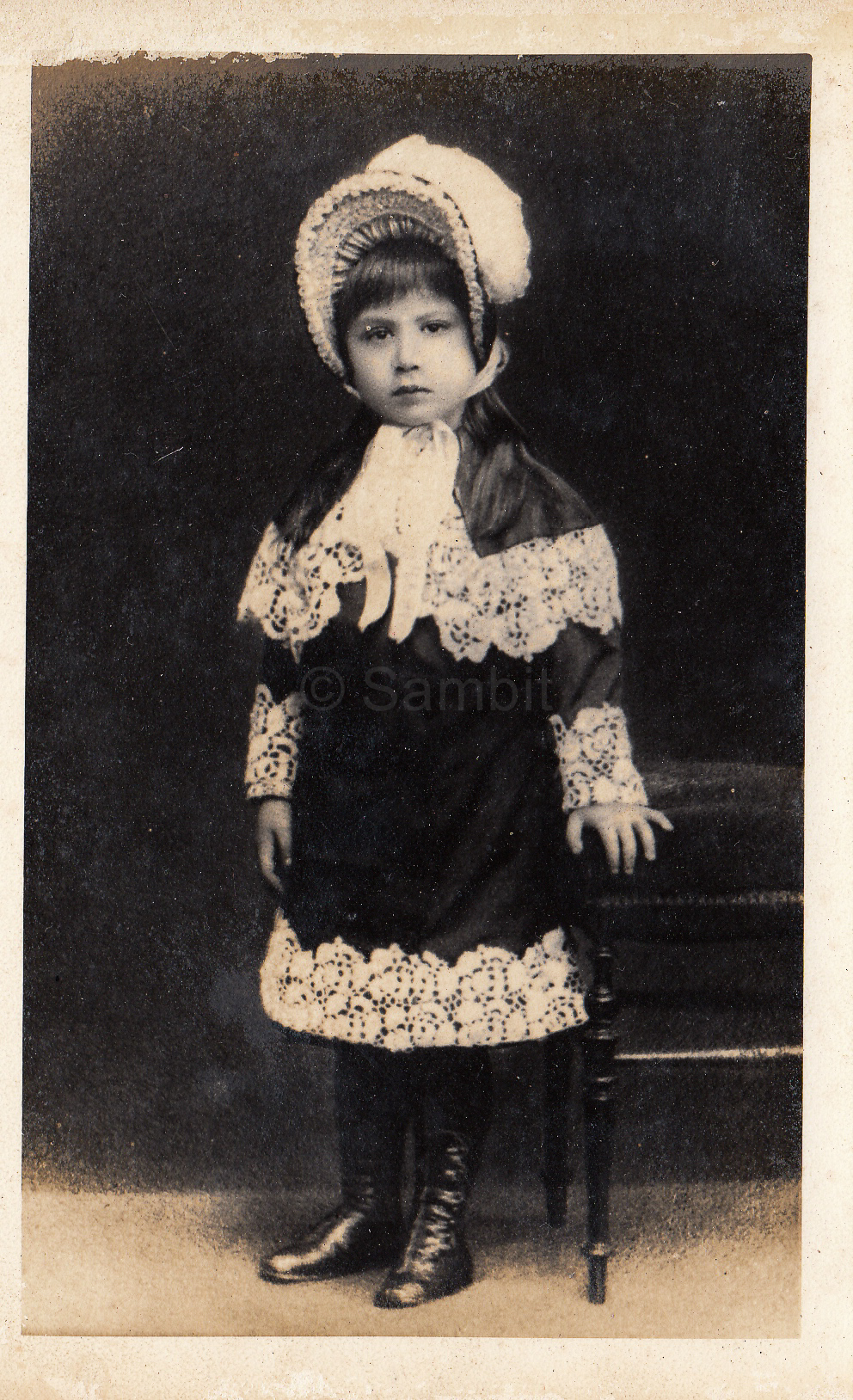
Alfassa

Mirra Alfassa was born in Paris in 1878 to Mathilde Ismalun, an Egyptian Jew, and Moïse Maurice Alfassa, a Turkish Jew who migrated from Edirne via Egypt. The family emigrated to France a year before Mirra was born. Mirra Alfassa was close to her grandmother Mira Ismalum (née Pinto), who was one of the first women to travel alone outside Egypt. They were a bourgeois family, and Alfassa's full name at birth was Blanche Rachel Mirra Alfassa. Her older brother, Mattéo Mathieu Maurice Alfassa, later held numerous French governmental posts in Africa.

Alfassa learned to read at the age of seven and began school at the age of nine. By the age of 14 she had read most of the books in her father's collection. Her biographer Vrekhem notes that Alfassa had various occult experiences in her childhood that she kept to herself, believing that her mother would have regarded occult experiences as a mental illness to be treated. Alfassa recalled having had, at the age of 13 or 14, a dream or a vision of a luminous figure whom she call Krishna.

=== As an artist and traveller ===
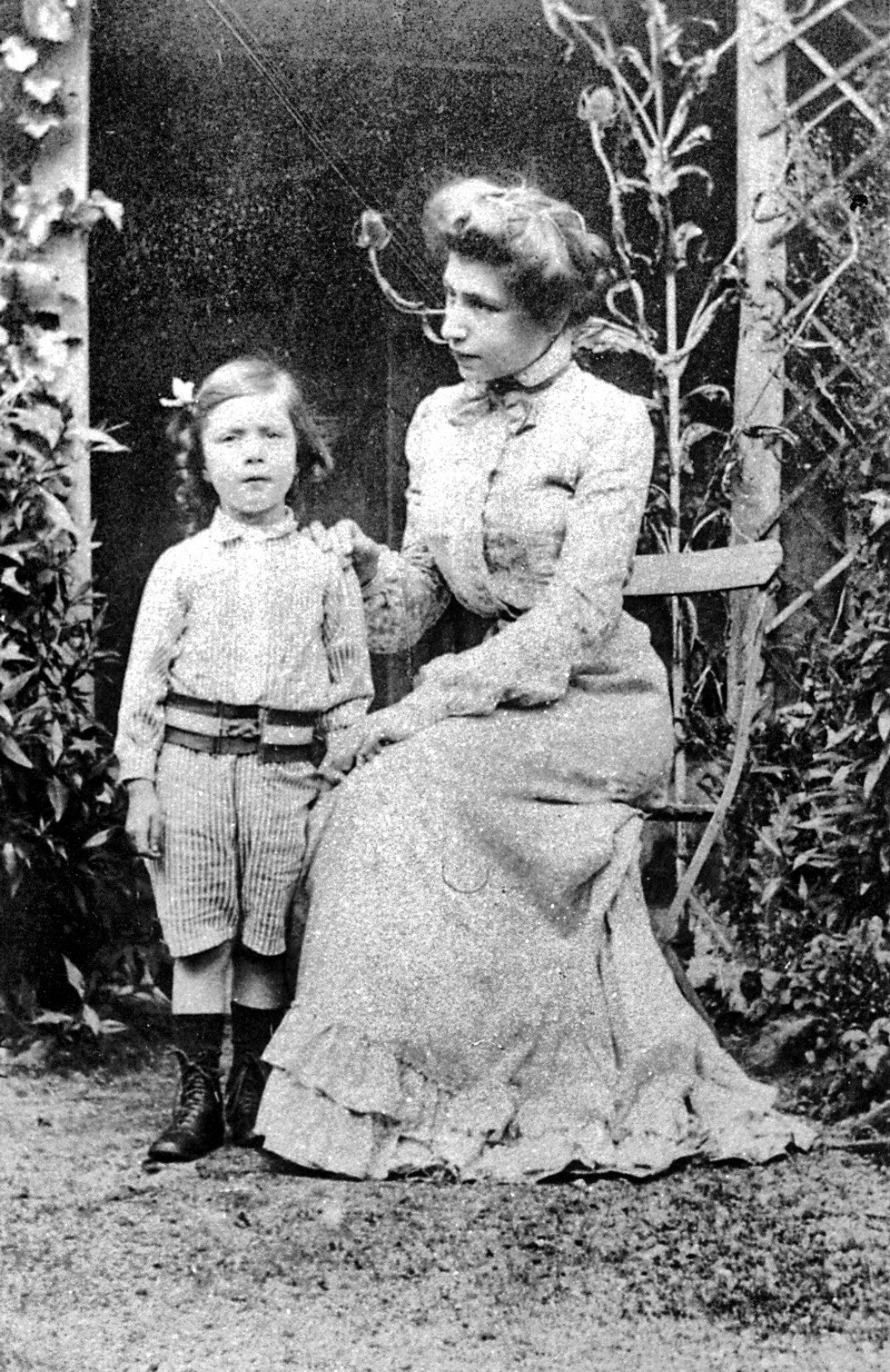
Alfassa at the age of 24 with son Andre, circa 1902

==== In Paris ====
In 1893 after graduating from school, Alfassa joined Académie Julian to study art. Her grandmother Mira Ismalum introduced her to fr:Henri Morisset, an ex-student of the Académie, and they were married in 1897. Both were well-off and worked as artists for the next ten years, during an era known for having many impressionist artists. Alfassa's son André was born in 1898. Some of Alfassa's paintings were accepted by the jury of Salon d'Automne and were exhibited in 1903, 1904 and 1905. She was an atheist during this time, yet was experiencing visions which she thought of not as mental formations but as spontaneous experiences. She kept the experiences to herself but developed an urge to understand their significance. She came across the book Raja Yoga by Swami Vivekananda and Bhagavad Gita which offered explanations for her experiences.

==== Max and Mrs. Théon (Mary Ware) ====
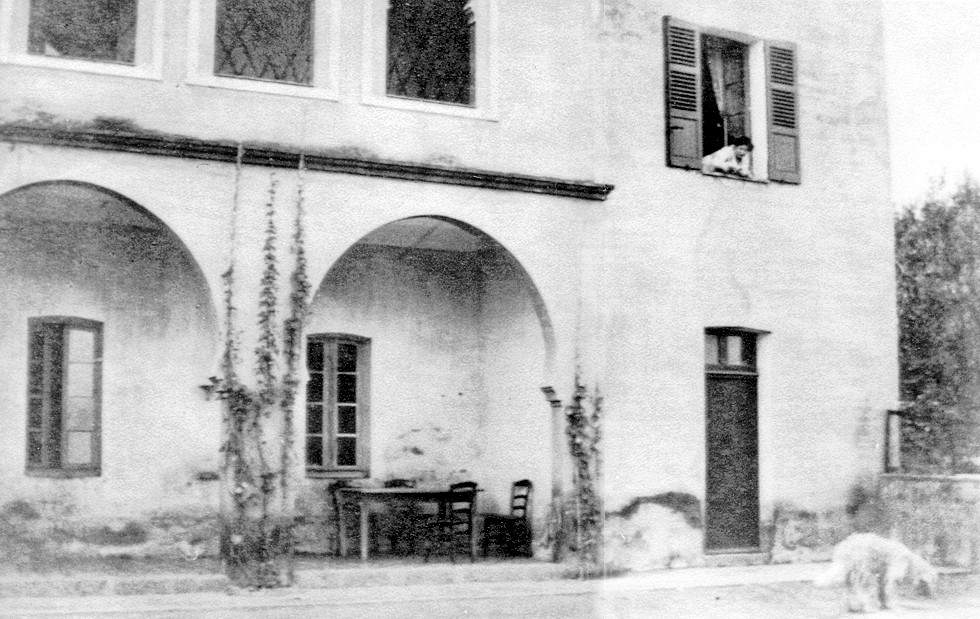
Mirra Alfassa in Théon's house at Tlemcen, Algeria (1906–1907)

During this time Alfassa made the acquaintance of Louis Thémanlys who was the head of the Cosmic Movement, a group started by Max Théon. After reading a copy of Cosmic Review, Alfassa began attending Thémanlys's public lectures and became active in the group. In 1906 she travelled to the Algerian city of Tlemcen to meet with Max Théon and his wife Mary Ware at their estate. She consequently travelled there twice more, in 1906 and 1907, and there practised and experimented with the teachings of Théon and Ware.

In 1908, Alfassa moved to 49 rue de Lévis, Paris, living alone in a small apartment and involving herself in discussions with Buddhists and Cosmic Movement circles. During this time she also made the acquaintance of Madame David-Néel.

In 1911, Alfassa married Paul Richard, who, after serving four years in the army, had become interested in philosophy and theology. Alfassa was introduced to Richard by Max Théon.

==== First meetings with Sri Aurobindo and Japan ====
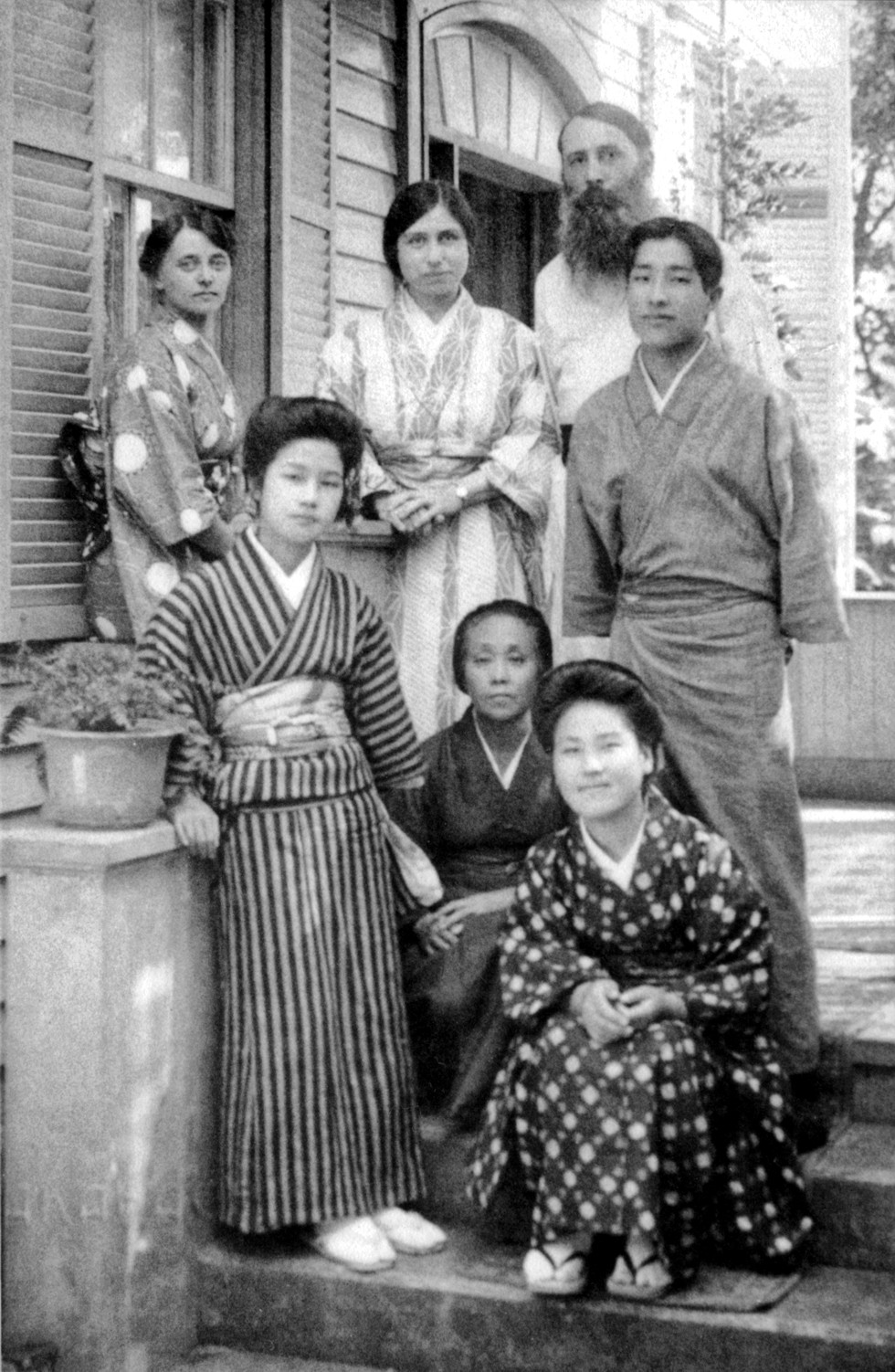
Dorothy Hodgson (Dutta), Alfassa, Paul Richard and Japanese friends in Tokyo, circa 1918

Alfassa's husband, Paul Richard, was an aspiring politician and had attempted to win election to the French senate from Pondicherry, which was then under French control. After losing on his first attempt, he wanted to run again, and in 1914 Alfassa and Richard set sail for India, reaching Pondicherry at the end of March. Alfassa and Richard stayed at the Grand Hotel D'Europe, and during this time they met Sri Aurobindo. Alfassa recognised Sri Aurobindo as a figure from her visions. During a later meeting, Alfassa experienced what she described as a complete silence of the mind, free from any thought.

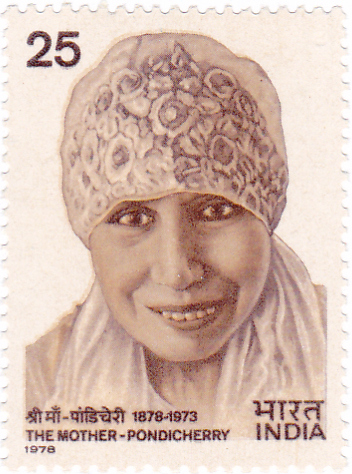
Alfassa on a 1978 stamp of India

Richard lost the election and decided to publish a journal about the yoga of Sri Aurobindo. The journal, called Arya, was written in both English and French, was first published in August 1914 and ran for the next six and half years. By this time World War I had erupted, and Indian revolutionaries were being prosecuted by the British for being spies of the German army. Although Sri Aurobindo had ceased his activities against British rule, he was considered to be a threat, and all the revolutionaries were asked to move to Algeria. Sri Aurobindo refused and the British asked the French government to hand over revolutionaries living in French Pondicherry. The British request came to Alfassa's brother, Mattéo Alfassa, who by then was foreign minister, and who slipped the letter amongst other files where it would not be seen by anyone else.

In 1915, at the insistence of the British, Richard was withdrawn from Pondicherry by the French government. After an unsuccessful attempt to remain there, Alfassa and Richard returned to Paris in February 1915. After a number of years in Paris, Richard was posted to Japan and China as a trade commissioner. Alfassa and Richard left for Japan, never to return to Paris again. Their time in Japan was relatively peaceful, and they spent the following four years there. In April 1920, however, Alfassa and Richard returned to Pondicherry. Alfassa moved to live near Sri Aurobindo in the guest house at Rue François Martin. Richard spent a year travelling around north India before returning to France. The couple later divorced. In November 1920, Alfassa to moved into Sri Aurobindo's house where she lived communally with other residents.

== Foundation of the ashram ==
Integral yoga

Initially, Alfassa was not fully accepted by the other commune members, and was considered an outsider. Sri Aurobindo considered her to be of equal yogic stature to him and started calling her "The Mother". From 1924, Alfassa took over managing the household, which was gradually turned into an ashram. In 1926, Sri Aurobindo began to retire from regular activities and to focus on his yogic practises. The commune had grown to 85 members.

== Integral yoga and the Siddhi Day ==
Alfassa, now referred to as "The Mother", became a revered yoga teacher. On 24 November 1926, later declared Siddhi Day (Victory Day) and still celebrated by Sri Aurobindo Ashram, Mother and Sri Aurobindo declared that overmind consciousness had manifested directly in physical consciousness, allowing the possibility for human consciousness to be directly aware and be in the overmind consciousness. (Note: A detailed description of the Overmind is provided in Book I ch.28, and Book II ch.26, of Aurobindo's philosophical opus The Life Divine)

Some commune members lodged complaints against Alfassa over her management of the ashram. In response, Sri Aurobindo declared her to be in sole charge of further activities of the ashram in 1930.

Sri Aurobindo and Mother's work and principles of yoga was named by them: integral yoga, an all-embracing yoga. This yoga was in variance with older ways of yoga because the follower would not give up the outer life to live in a monastery, but would be present in regular life and practise spirituality in all parts of life.

By 1937 the ashram residents had grown to more than 150, so there was a need for an expansion of buildings and facilities, helped by Diwan Hyder Ali, the Nizam of Hyderabad who had made a grant to the ashram for further expansion. Under the guidance of Mother, Antonin Raymond, the chief architect, assisted by Franticek Sammer and George Nakashima, constructed a dormitory building. By this time the second world war erupted delaying the construction but was finally completed after ten years and was named Golconde. In 1938 Margaret Woodrow Wilson, the daughter of US President Woodrow Wilson, came to the ashram and chose to remain there for the rest of her life.

By 1939 World War II had broken out. Some of the members of the ashram may have supported Hitler indirectly because Britain was attacked, but both Mother and Sri Aurobindo publicly declared their support for the Allied forces, mainly by donating to the Viceroy's war fund, much to the surprise of many Indians.

== School in ashram and the death of Sri Aurobindo ==
On 2 December 1943 Mother started a school for about twenty children inside the ashram. She considered this was a considerable movement away from usual life in the ashram, which was until then about practising total renunciation of the outside world. However, she found that the school would gradually align to the principles of Sri Aurobindo's integral yoga. The school later became known as the Sri Aurobindo International Centre of Education. From 21 February 1949 she started a quarterly journal called The Bulletin in which Sri Aurobindo published a series of eight articles under the title "The supramental manifestation upon earth" wherein for the first time he wrote about transitional being between man and superman.

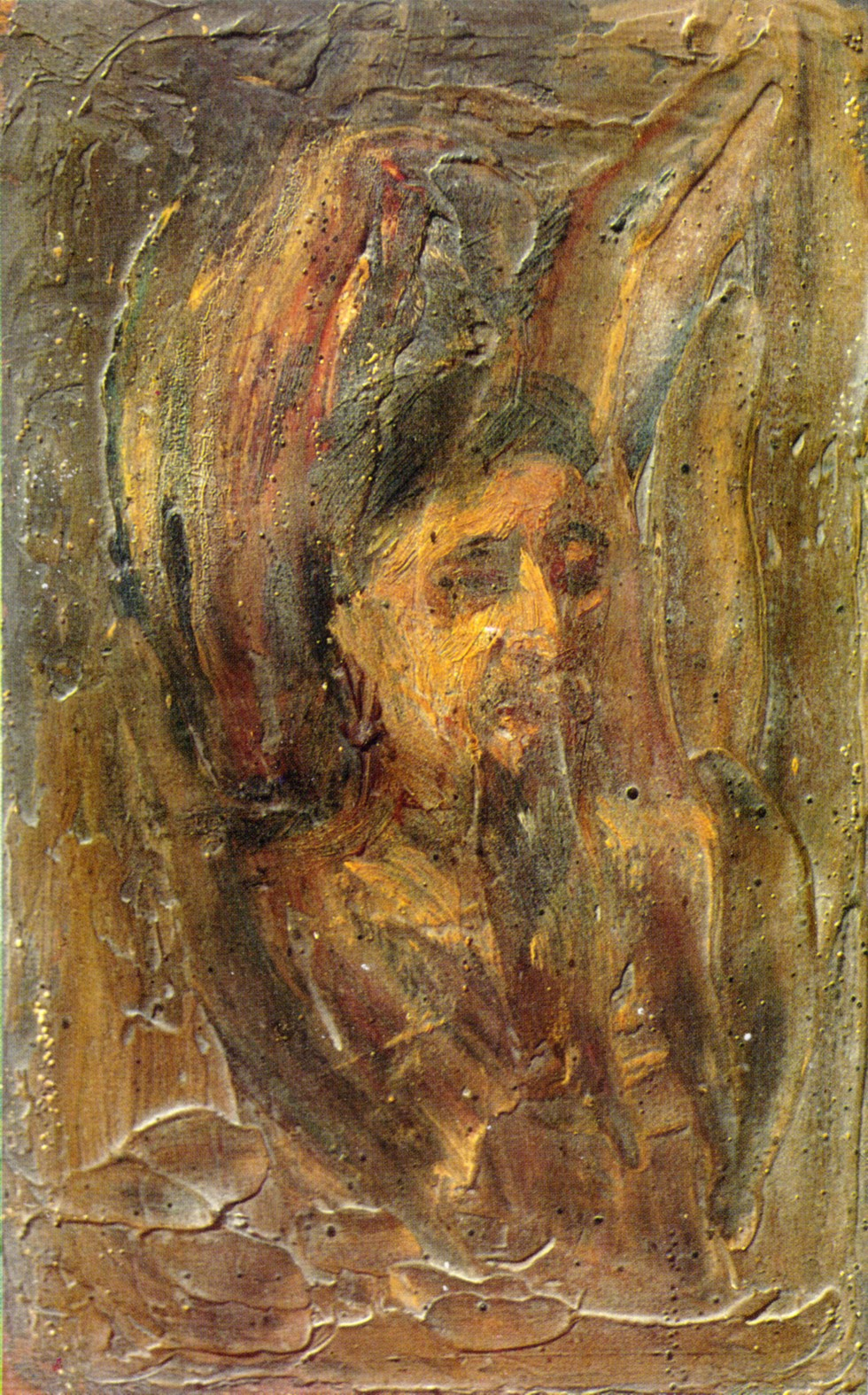
Mirra Alfassa's painting: 'Divine Consciousness Emerging from the Inconscient', 1920–1925

Sri Aurobindo died on 5 December 1950. All the activities in the ashram were suspended for twelve days, after which Mother had to decide the future course of the ashram. Mother decided to take up the entire work of the ashram and also to continue the integral yoga internally. The years from 1950 to 1958 were the years where she was mostly seen by her disciples.

== Pondicherry, India ==
On 15 August 1954 French Pondicherry became a union territory of India. Alfassa declared dual citizenship for India and France, which she tried to obtain but was unable to due to nationality law which had come into force and became an Indian citizen in 1954. Jawaharlal Nehru visited the ashram on 16 January 1955 and met with her. This meeting cleared many doubts he had about the ashram. During his second visit to the ashram on 29 September 1955, his daughter Indira Gandhi accompanied him. Alfassa had a profound effect on her, which developed into a close relationship in later years. Mother continued to teach French after the passing of Sri Aurobindo. She started with just simple conversations and recitations, which later expanded into deeper discussions about integral yoga where she would read a passage from Sri Aurobindo's or her own writings and comment on them. These sessions grew into a seven-volume book called Questions and Answers.

After 1958, Alfassa slowly started to withdraw from outer activities. The year 1958 was also marked by greater progress in yoga. She stopped all her activities from 1959 onwards to devote herself completely towards yoga. On 21 February 1963, on her 85th birthday, she gave her first Darshan from the terrace that had been built for her. From then on she would be present there, on Darshan days where visitors below would gather around to catch a glimpse of her. Mother regularly met with many disciples and one of them was Satprem. He had recorded their conversations, which later he gathered in a volume of 13 books called Mother's Agenda.

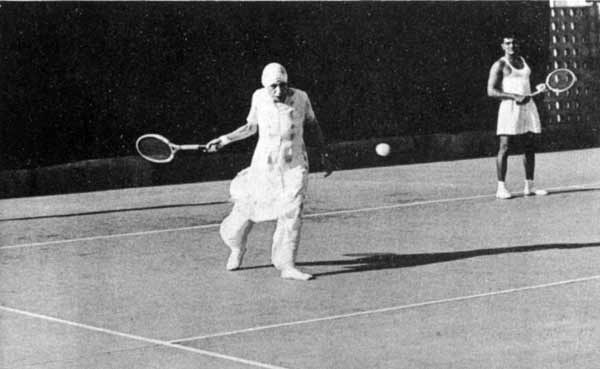
Alfassa playing tennis

== Establishing Auroville ==
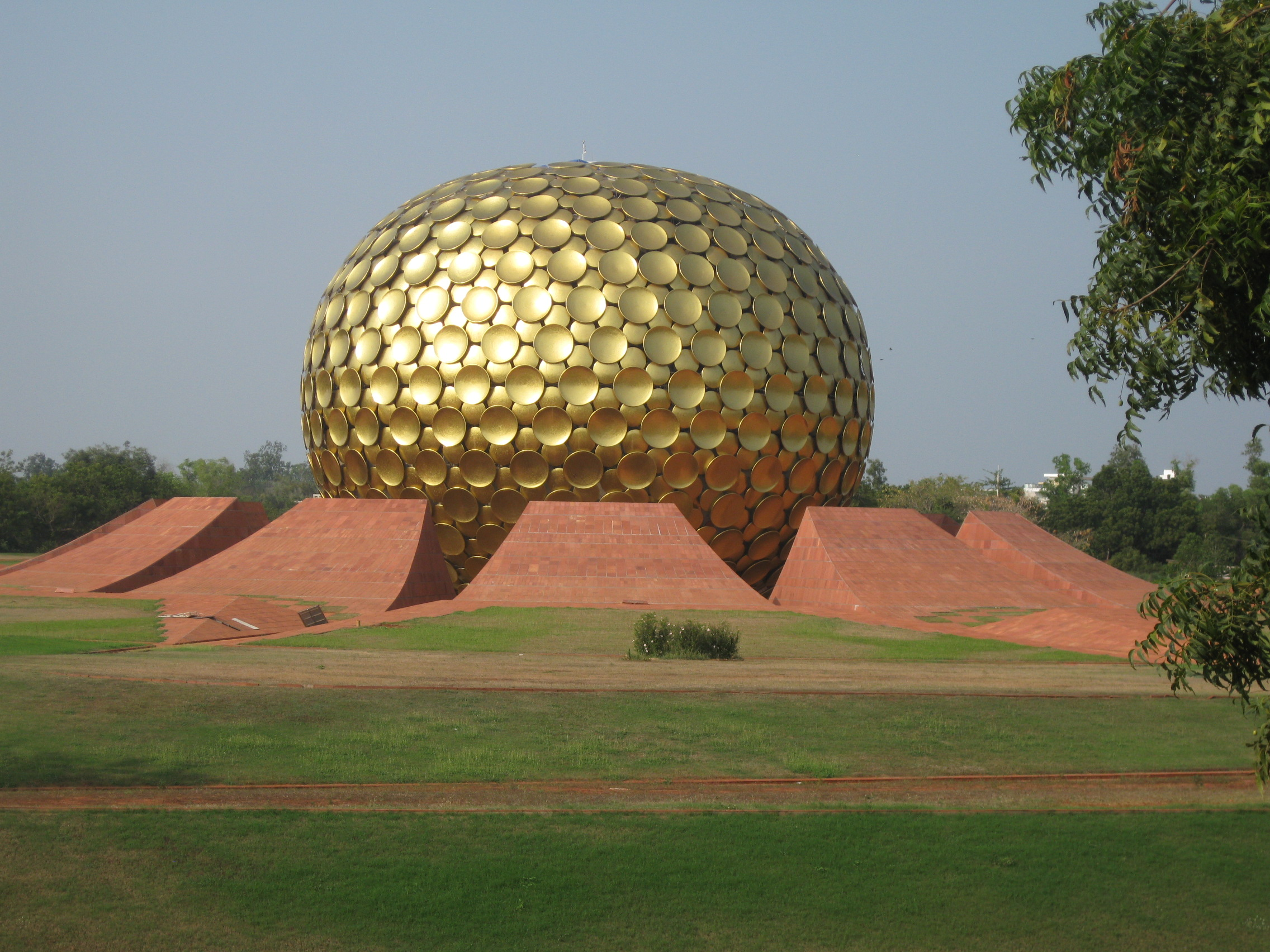
Matrimandir, in Auroville, near Pondicherry

Mother had published an article titled "The Dream" in which she suggested a place on earth that no nation could claim as its sole property, for all humanity with no distinction. In 1964 it was finally decided to build this city. On 28 February 1968 they drew up a charter for the city, Auroville, meaning City of the Dawn (derived from the French word aurore), a model universal township where one of the aims would be to bring about human unity. The city still exists and continues to grow (although not in terms of permanent residents as recorded by census).

== Later years ==
Many politicians visited Alfassa on a regular basis. She had visits from V. V. Giri, Nandini Satpathy, the Dalai Lama, and especially Indira Gandhi, who was in close contact with her. By the end of March 1973 she became critically ill. After 20 May 1973 all meetings were cancelled. Alfassa died at 7:25 pm on 17 November 1973 at the age of 95. She was buried on 20 November in Samadhi, next to Sri Aurobindo's body.

- Heehs, Peter (2008). The Lives of Sri Aurobindo. Columbia University Press. ISBN 978-0-231-14098-0.
- Vrekhem, Georges Van (2004). the Mother the story of her life. Rupa & Co. ISBN 8129105934.
- Jones, Constance A.; Ryan, James D. (2007). "The Mother (Mirra Richard)". Encyclopedia of Hinduism. Encyclopedia of World Religions. J. Gordon Melton, Series Editor. New York: Facts On File. pp. 292–293. ISBN 978-0-8160-5458-9. Archived from the original on 2 April 2020.
- Nirodbaran (1972). Twelve Years with Sri Aurobindo. Vol. 1. Pondicherry: Sri Aurobindo Ashram.
- Purani, A. B., ed. (1982). Evening Talks with Sri Aurobindo. Pondicherry: Sri Aurobindo Ashram.

== Partial bibliography ==
- Commentaries on the Dhammapada, Lotus Press, Twin Lakes, WI 2004, ISBN 0-940985-25-X
- Flowers and Their Messages, Lotus Press, Twin Lakes, WI ISBN 0-941524-68-X
- Search for the Soul in Everyday Living, Lotus Press, Twin Lakes, WI ISBN 0-941524-57-4
- Soul and Its Powers, Lotus Press, Twin Lakes, WI ISBN 0-941524-67-1
