= Divine spark =

Theological concept about the portion of God that resides within each human being

The divine spark is a concept used in various different religious traditions. In Gnosticism, it is the portion of God that resides within each living being. Some Quakers consider Jesus' inward light to be a divine spark.

== Gnosticism ==
According to Gnosticism, the purpose of life is to enable the Divine Spark to be released from its captivity in matter and reestablish its connection with, or simply return to, God, who is perceived as being the source of the Divine Light. In the Gnostic Christian tradition, Christ is seen as a wholly divine being which has taken human form in order to lead humanity back to the Light.

The Cathars of medieval Europe also shared the belief in the divine spark. They saw this idea expressed most powerfully in the opening words of the Gospel of St John.

== Quakers ==
Quakers, known formally as the Religious Society of Friends, are generally united by a belief in each human's ability to experience the light within. Some Friends understand this as a kind of divine spark, some aspect of the divine that inheres in the human, which they often express as "that of God in every one". For this idea, they often turn to a passage in the journal of George Fox, the prophetic founder of Quakerism. However, this idea of the Light as divine spark was introduced, not by Fox, but by Rufus Jones early in the twentieth century, as clarified by Lewis Benson. Friends often focus on feeling the presence of God. As Isaac Penington wrote in 1670, "It is not enough to hear of Christ, or read of Christ, but this is the thing – to feel him to be my root, my life, and my foundation..." Quakers reject the idea of priests, believing in the priesthood of all believers. Some express their concept of God using phrases such as "the inner light", "inward light of Christ", or "Holy Spirit". Quakers first gathered around George Fox in the mid–17th century and belong to a historically Protestant Christian set of denominations.

== See also ==
- Ātman (Hinduism)
- Buddha-nature
- Divine embodiment
- Divine illumination
- Divine presence
- Enlightenment in Buddhism
- Fitra
- Image of God
- Inward light
- Manda (Mandaeism)
- Manda d-Hayyi in Mandaeism
- Nitzutzot in Judaism
- The Vitalist idea of the divine spark as cause of life
