= Samadhistha Purusha =

Sanskrit term for a contemplative being

A samadhistha purusha (Sanskrit: समाधिस्थ पुरुष, romanized: samādhistha purūśa) refers to a Sanskrit term for a person who stays in a state of calm equipoise. Such a person is regarded to remain unaffected in all situations and receives all emotions with a sense of detachment. A samadhistha purusha is also considered a self-realised person, remaining in a meditative state voluntarily, and at all times.

== Etymology ==
The term samadhistha purusha is made up of two words: samadhistha and purusha. Purusha in this context refers to the practitioner. Further, samadhistha is a Sanskrit compound made up of two terms: samādhi (Sanskrit: समाधी) and stha (Sanskrit: स्थ). Samādhi is a meditative state of consciousness according to Hinduism, Jainism, Buddhism, Sikhism and yogic schools. Such trance-like state is achieved by intense meditation or dhyana. And, stha would mean 'still' or 'inactive'. However, philosopher Kireet Joshi points out: He (samadhistha purusha) is sthita (still), but not inactive. He is equal–minded but not inactive.

== Description ==
A samadhistha purusha remains unchanged, unaltered, unaffected through happiness or sadness, praise or condemnation, bliss or sorrow, loneliness or companionship, highs or lows of life. Such a person navigates life mindfully with an equanimous outlook. He has control over his mental faculties of indriya enabling him to check his mind from auto-response and to free it from conditioning. A samadhistha purusha is always in a meditative trance, by will. It doesn't mean that such a person is inactive or passive. In fact, a samadhistha person is self-realised person who is in touch with his true nature. He becomes the master of his faculties or indriya, rather than being a slave to them. He is immersed in the super-consciousness. In The Synthesis of Yoga, Aurobindo, says a soul that has settled in samadhi (samadhistha) without distraction and can embrace all in the scope of its being without being bound by any or deluded or limited".

== Literature ==
The significance of being a samadhistha purusha could be deducted from the fact that such a person, his qualities, characteristics and mannerisms are discussed in the Bhagavad Gita, between Krishna and Arjuna.

In the Bhagavad Gita, Krishna describes a samadhistha purusha from shloka 55 through 72. He describes the practitioner as:

"O Partha, when one discards all selfish desires and cravings of the senses that torment the mind, and becomes satisfied in the realization of the self, such a person is said to be transcendentally situated. One whose mind remains undisturbed amidst misery, who does not crave for pleasure, and who is free from attachment, fear, and anger, is called a sage of steady wisdom. One who remains unattached under all conditions, and is neither delighted by good fortune nor dejected by tribulation, he is a sage with perfect knowledge. One who is able to withdraw the senses from their objects, just as a tortoise withdraws its limbs into its shell, is established in divine wisdom. Aspirants may restrain the senses from their objects of enjoyment, but the taste for the sense objects remains. However, even this taste ceases for those who realizes the Supreme. The senses are so strong and turbulent, O son of Kunti, that they can forcibly carry away the mind even of a person endowed with discrimination and practicing self-control..... That person, who gives up all material desires and lives free from a sense of greed, proprietorship, and egoism, attains perfect peace. O Partha, such is the state of an enlightened soul that having attained it, one is never again deluded. Being established in this consciousness even at the hour of death, one is liberated from the cycle of life and death and reaches the Supreme Abode of God."
