= Auroville Village Action Group =

- Founded: 1983
- Founded at: Auroville, India
- Type: Community organization
- Purpose: poverty eradication, gender equality, caste equality, empowerment
- Headquarters: Irumbai, India
- Region served: Vanur block, Tamil Nadu, India
- Directors: Anbu Sironmani, Jerald Moris
- Website: www.villageaction.in

The Auroville Village Action Group (AVAG) is a non-governmental organization based in Irumbai which is situated close to Auroville in the Villupuram district, located in Tamil Nadu, India. It is committed to grass roots community building together with the local villages in the Villupuram district on different development areas, namely community development, economic development, capacity building, and psychosocial support. In all those four areas, the ultimate goal is to "realize the inherent capability of human beings for self-empowerment [and to] provide the proper resources to build a healthy life".

Founded in 1983, it nowadays incorporates micro finance projects, capacity building trainings and seminars, psychological and physical health initiatives, livelihood trainings and social enterprise trainings, caste integration exchange programs, and exposure field trips.

== Mission and values ==
AVAG collaborates with all sectors of society to bring about a holistic and participatory village transformation where the villagers are the main acting force. AVAG sees its main role as enabling the beneficiaries to become more self-empowered. It places relationships between human beings and their behaviors, traditions and prejudices at the foundation of its programs and work with villagers, following the central goal of gender and cast equality. Solidarity and cooperation are also important values to AVAG.

== Structure ==
In July 2000, the Auroville Village Action Trust developed out of AVAG's diverse activities in order to them better. Since then, AVAG is a part of this trust.

Field work is carried out by a team of 6 development workers who themselves come from Vanur block and are deeply familiar with the ground realities. They receive special training and are often the direct link between the trustees and direct beneficiaries. Additionally, 2 vocational trainers and a team of 8 support staff make up the rest of the AVAG team. AVAG regularly hosts students, interns and volunteers from abroad who assist in all aspects of programs delivery. The immediate beneficiaries are the members of the women and men self-help groups (SHGs), who usually meet twice a month to discuss loans and personal issues or to receive training. Every SHG elects an animator and two representatives each month.

=== Programs ===
==== Eco-friendly products for villagers ====
A store is located on AVAG premises and provides access to affordable echo-friendly technologies suitable for rural communities, such as spirulina supplements, energy powder, CFL bulbs, activated EM, low-cost water filters, and solar-powered devices.

==== Social enterprise initiatives and livelihood training programs ====
AVAG offers a large number of trainings, and creates self-employment opportunities for members of women's SHGs. Together with the Sustainable Enterprise Development in the Auroville Bioregion (SEDAB) project, which is part of a wider Integral Rural Development vision for the bioregion, the goal is to provide sustainable livelihood options for women in villages in and around Auroville. Several different products are being produced and sold as part of the social enterprise initiative, such as clothes and accessories and crocheted life style products, like toys and lamps, and accessories (under AVAG's own brand Aval), herbal beauty products, spirulina capsules (under the brand Surya.)

=== Funding ===
AVAG has varying supporters, also relying on individual donors. The BMZ gives AVAG a notable supporting sum each year under the Verein zur Förderung der Auroville-Region (VFAVR), affiliated with AVI Germany. They also supported the issue of the AVVAI scheme. Other funding partners are the Village Outreach Society of Canada and the United Kingdom, who have supported Eco Femme, AVAG's exchange programs and the solar lantern project of the EcoLife store. World Dignity, Inc. (WDI), an organization working internationally to build on the strength, resilience, culture and wisdom of all people, created the AVAG/WDI Education Revolving Fund to help financially poor club members pay for their children's higher education through loans or grants together with AVAG. Motherson Sumi Systems Limited has given a 1 Crore grant towards a project increasing access to education for poor girls in June 2015 as part of their Corporate social responsibility (CSR) program.

== History ==
In 1983, AVAG was founded by Bhavana Dee Decew "to act as a bridge between [Auroville] and immediate neighbours." At that time, a few programs with children and women were started in the villages surrounding Auroville. Gradually, professional social workers joined and turned AVAG into an official developmental project. With OXFAM India's help starting 1991, AVAG expanded its scope in terms of working areas and adjointed activities and field staff could be recruited and trained. The Commonwealth Human Ecology Council (CHEC) of the Overseas Development Agency (ODA)-UK, later called the Department for International Development (DfID), also supported AVAG so that its work expanded further. Thanks to the DfID's funding, the Women's Federation and the men's groups could also be established in 1999. When the 2004 Indian Ocean earthquake and tsunami hit Tamil Nadu, AVAG experienced a major financial and labor crisis. Many activities had to be reduced or shut down but it was sustained with the help of the women and men SHGs and the leaders of the villages. ACDC also supported AVAG's work in the tsunami hit areas. ACDC continued to support AVAG until 2009. In 2010, the social enterprise initiative got started with the assistance of the Sustainable Enterprise Development in the Auroville Bioregion (SEDAB), scheduled to run until the middle of 2016. The BMZ project set up a revolving fund with the German government's support, mainly for enabling the distribution of grants to poor girls for obtaining a better education. Currently, AVAG is working on setting up education programs for adolescent girls and boys and marketing its products more. Also, flood relief after the hundred-year 2015 South Indian floods in the Villupuram district is still going on.

== Affiliations ==
AVAG is closely working together with people in Auroville, for certain events such as flood relief help and different entrepreneurial projects inside of Auroville. Some of AVAG's women stitch disposable cloth pads for EcoFemme, they have also recently started to assist in stitching scarves made by The Colours of Nature One different project which AVAG is working together with Auroville on right now is the Paalam project, Paalam meaning bridge in Tamil, which is a bioregional and Auroville youth leadership program and "aims to provide training in sustainable village development through a programme that would include exposure to Auroville and its ideals and to model village development throughout Tamil Nadu." Once a year, a student from the American University of Paris (AUP) joins AVAG for a few weeks to assist it in the communications sector. AVAG is associated with the National Australia Bank, the Indian Bank and the ICICI Bank for the microfinancing and SHG loans. They send a mobile bank to AVAG twice a week and issue the loans to the SHG women. The German BMZ is supporting one or two young volunteers coming to AVAG via Auroville International (AVI) Deutschland e.V., a non-profit organization which is amongst other things a volunteer sending agency via weltwärts, each year for a year's duration.

== See also ==
- Auroville
- Village design statement
