= Roger Anger =

French architect

Robert Anger
- Born: March 24, 1923
- Died: January 15, 2008 (aged 84)
- Notable work: Auroville; Île Verte (Grenoble); Matrimandir

Roger Anger (24 March 1923 – 15 January 2008) was a French architect who worked on the Auroville project, designed by Mirra Alfassa and endorsed by UNESCO and the Government of India. He also collaborated many times with Pierre Puccinelli, notably on the Île Verte in Grenoble.

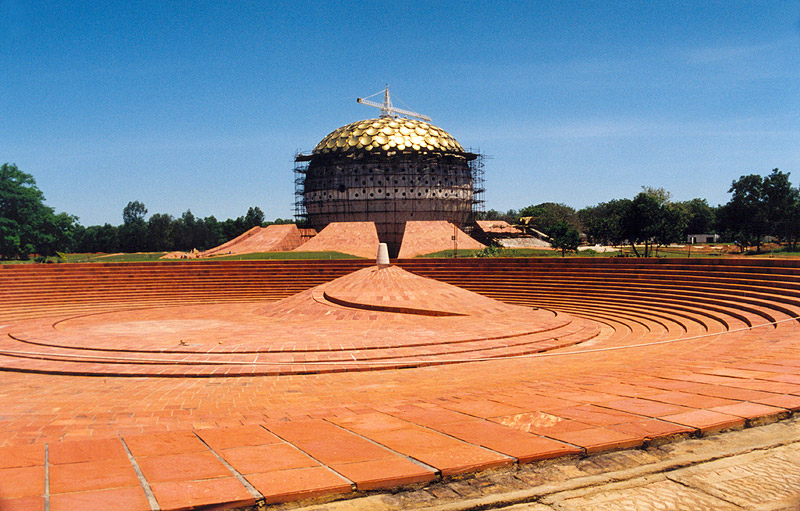
Auroville, India

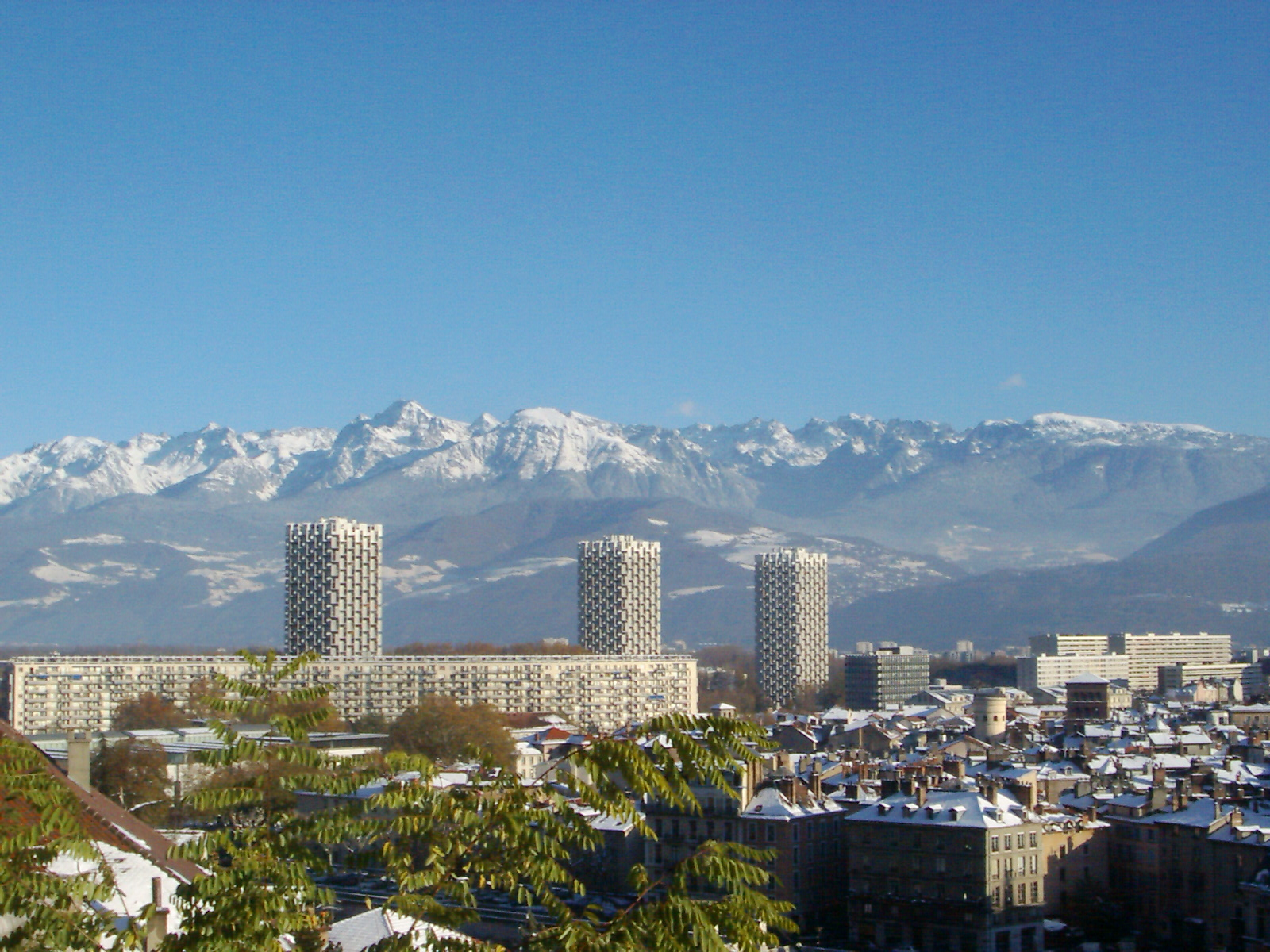
L'Île Verte in Grenoble.

== Biography ==
Born in the 15th arrondissement of Paris, Roger Anger was the youngest of three sons of lawyer Henri Anger. Originally, Roger Anger wanted to be a surgeon. Because of the war, he apprenticed in Antibes in the studio of the artist Capello. Impressed by his drawings, Capello encouraged him to study architecture. While preparing for his degree, Roger Anger gained his first experience of architecture, spending two years in Paul-Jacques Grillo's studio. Roger Anger completed his studies at the École des Beaux-Arts de Paris, graduating in 1947.

In 1953, he set up his own agency. This studio (on avenue Franklin Roosevelt, then rue Ordener and finally at 8, rue Brémontier until it was sold in 1983) was mainly commissioned for design and interior decoration. From then on, the studio began to respond to private commissions, in particular from the Compagnie Générale Immobilière de France (COGIFRANCE), with whom Roger Anger established regular contacts. His team of five architects, including Pierre Puccinelli, his main collaborator, Mario Heymann (from 1960), Michel Loyer (between 1959 and 1965), and Liliane Véder (between 1959 and 1964), enabled him to respond effectively to numerous competitions. The 1960s were a prolific period, with the workshop employing up to 100 people.

He was the architect of the Auroville project, imagined by Mirra Alfassa and sponsored by Unesco. He has also worked on numerous projects with Pierre Puccinelli, including the Île Verte (Grenoble) residence in Grenoble.

His partner Jacqueline restored the Château de Crestet in the Vaucluse region.

== Bibliography ==
- Anupama Kundoo: Roger Anger, Research on Beauty, Architecture 1953-2008, JOVIS Verlag Berlin 2009, ISBN 978-3-86859-006-7
