= Eco Femme =

Indian social enterprise

Eco Femme is a women-led social enterprise in Tamil Nadu, India, that produces organic washable cloth pads. Eco Femme was founded in 2009 in Auroville (a UNESCO-backed evolving city) by Kathy Walkling and Jessamijn Miedema who started by producing, applying and selling these washable menstrual pads in Auroville. The aim was to produce pads that are both affordable and free of plastic. They were also interested in designing a sustainable alternative to disposable pads for the women of India as well as setting up self-sustaining initiatives in cloth pad production for women from the neighbouring villages. All commercially sold pads are organically certified under GOTS and Eco Femme is the first in this space to have achieved this certification. The cloth pads are mostly made out of organic cotton and can last up to 75 washes or for three to five years from the time of purchasing. These pads are sold in more than 20 countries across the world. By 2022, Eco Femme has distributed over 1 million cloth pads which consequently saved more than 75 million single use disposable pads from reaching landfills.

Eco Femme enables women and girls to make educated decisions about their menstrual health in India and around the world by creating a dialogue around menstruation and offering education in menstrual literacy. They run two initiatives to enable free or affordable access to cloth pads. These include ‘Pad for Pad’ which provides an Indian adolescent girl with a free cloth pad kit for every pad sold internationally. Their "Pads for Sisters" programme provides subsidised pads to economically disadvantaged women Eco Femme has different partners across India, including 80 NGOs and 150 retailers.

Eco Femme has been recognised for these efforts by different institutions. It aims to encourage ecological and social transformation by revitalising menstrual practices that are empowering, ecologically sustainable, culturally sensitive and healthy for the user. Eco Femme has also conducted training programs on how to stitch cloth pads to support income generation and local livelihood for rural women. It also creates instructional materials, teaches facilitators, provides consulting services, and uses writing, filmmaking, and public speaking to advocate for non-polluting menstruation practises.

== Reception ==
The Huffington Post listed Eco Femme as one of the “15 Indian Businesses That Deserve Your Custom For Promoting Sustainability". It has also been named as one of the “5 Social Impact Startups Revolutionising Feminine Care Across Asia” by the Green Queen. It won crQlr’s Menstruation Sustainability Prize in 2022 for being a ‘pioneer in menstrual education in India’ and ‘enabling women and girls to make informed decisions about their menstrual health through their non-profit programs’. Eco Femme also won the Restore Awards in 2022 for their health products.

== Eco Femme in Media ==
Eco Femme has been featured on different podcasts, where they have discussed their mission to provide sustainable menstrual products and education to women in India and beyond.
