= Auroville Marathon =

Annual marathon run in India

- Date: Second Sunday of February
- Location: Auroville, Tamil Nadu, India
- Event type: Trail/Road
- Distance: Marathon, half marathon, 10k
- Established: 2008
- Website: https://www.aurovillemarathon.com/

The Auroville Marathon is an annual marathon (42.195 km or 26.219 mi) event that courses through the city of Dawn Auroville in Tamil Nadu state of India. They also have Half Marathon (21.0975 km or 13.1094 mi) and 10k runs added. It is one of the largest and most popular running events in India, with participants from different parts of India. The event is largely publicised by word of mouth and through blogs and other social networks by runners who have run the race before.

The event is organised by Auroville Runners (Saracon) in association with Auroville community since 2008. Originally started to celebrate the 40 years of Auroville, the enthusiastic participation attracted many runners from other cities, and it was decided to make it an annual affair. The event is non-commercial and organised purely for the joy of running. It considers all the finishers as winners and does not award any prize money for the early finishers. That is precisely why this is not a timed run.

== Results ==
=== Full, Half & 10K Marathon ===
Year	Participants	Start point	Finish point	Finished Result
2017	298	Unknown	Unknown	
2018	Unknown	Unknown	Unknown	
