= Île Verte (Grenoble) =

Coordinates: 45°11′49″N 5°44′17″E

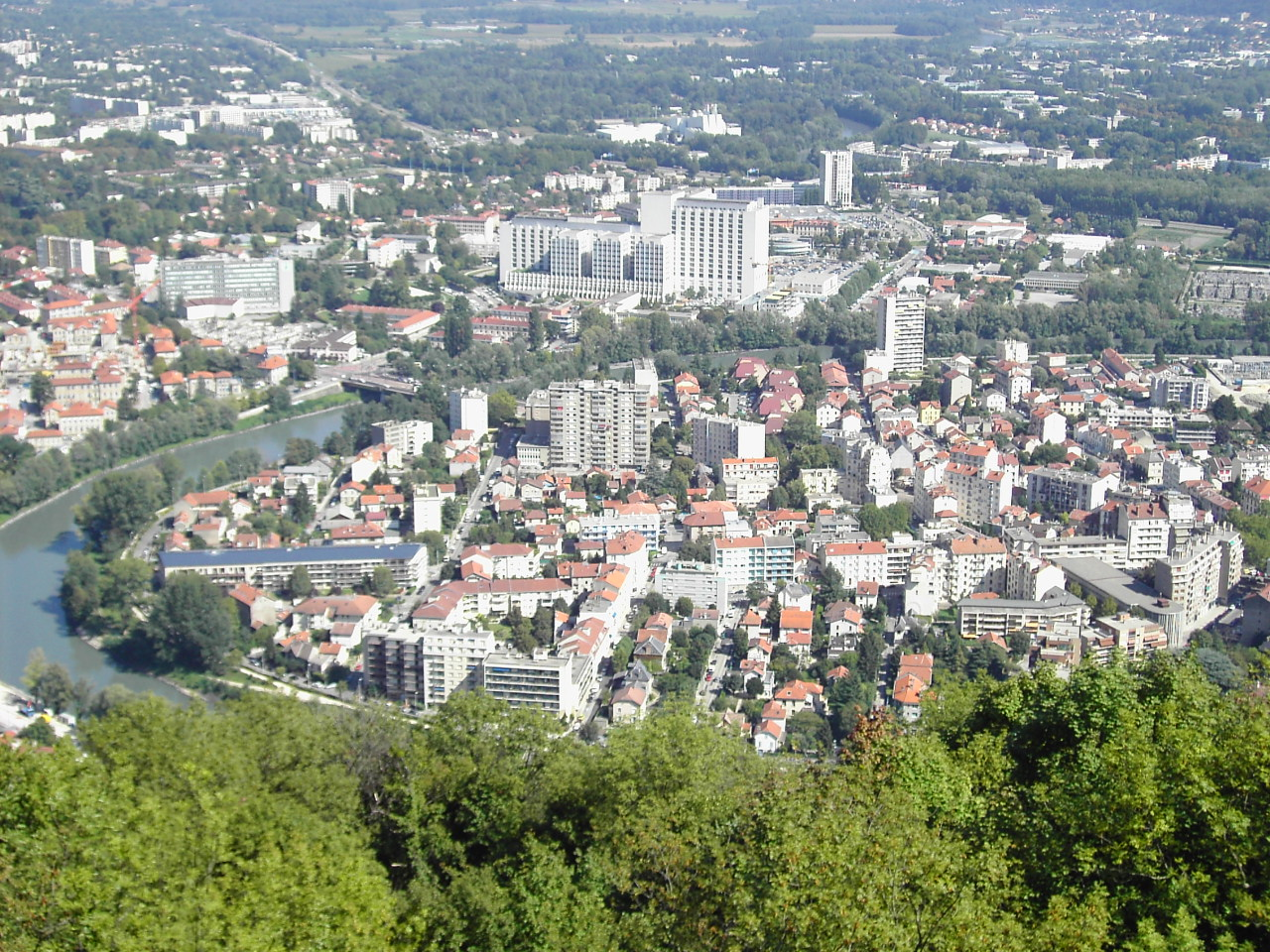
Quartier de l'ile verte

Île Verte is a neighborhood in Grenoble, France, located in a bend in the river Isère. It is relatively independent from downtown. The district is one of the most heavily populated in the town, due primarily to the large apartments (three large towers, as well as an ?S-shaped apartment complex). The area is mostly residential, but the Police Headquarters (Hotel de Police) is also located here.

== The Three Towers ==
The landmark Residence Île Verte, popularly referred to as "the Three Towers of Grenoble," was built within a park in the Île Verte district between 1963 and 1967, on a plan by Roger Anger and Pierre Puccinelli. At a height of 98 meters (not counting the antenna), the three towers were the highest inhabited buildings in Europe when they were completed, with a total of 504 apartments spread among 28 inhabited floors, each tower containing a total of 33 stories. The towers are named Belledonne, Vercors, and Mont Blanc.

== Photos of the district ==
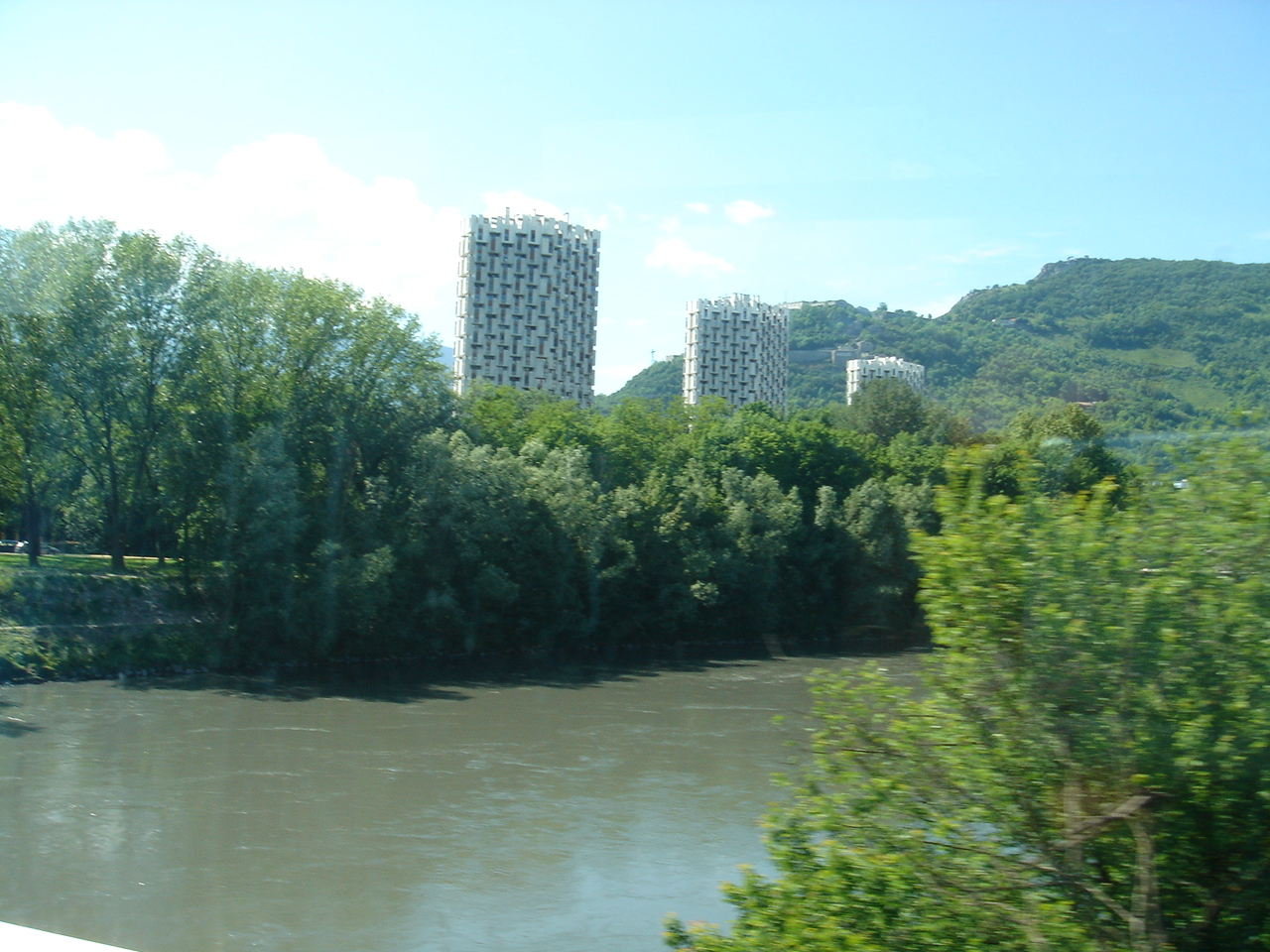
Three towers of Ile Verte

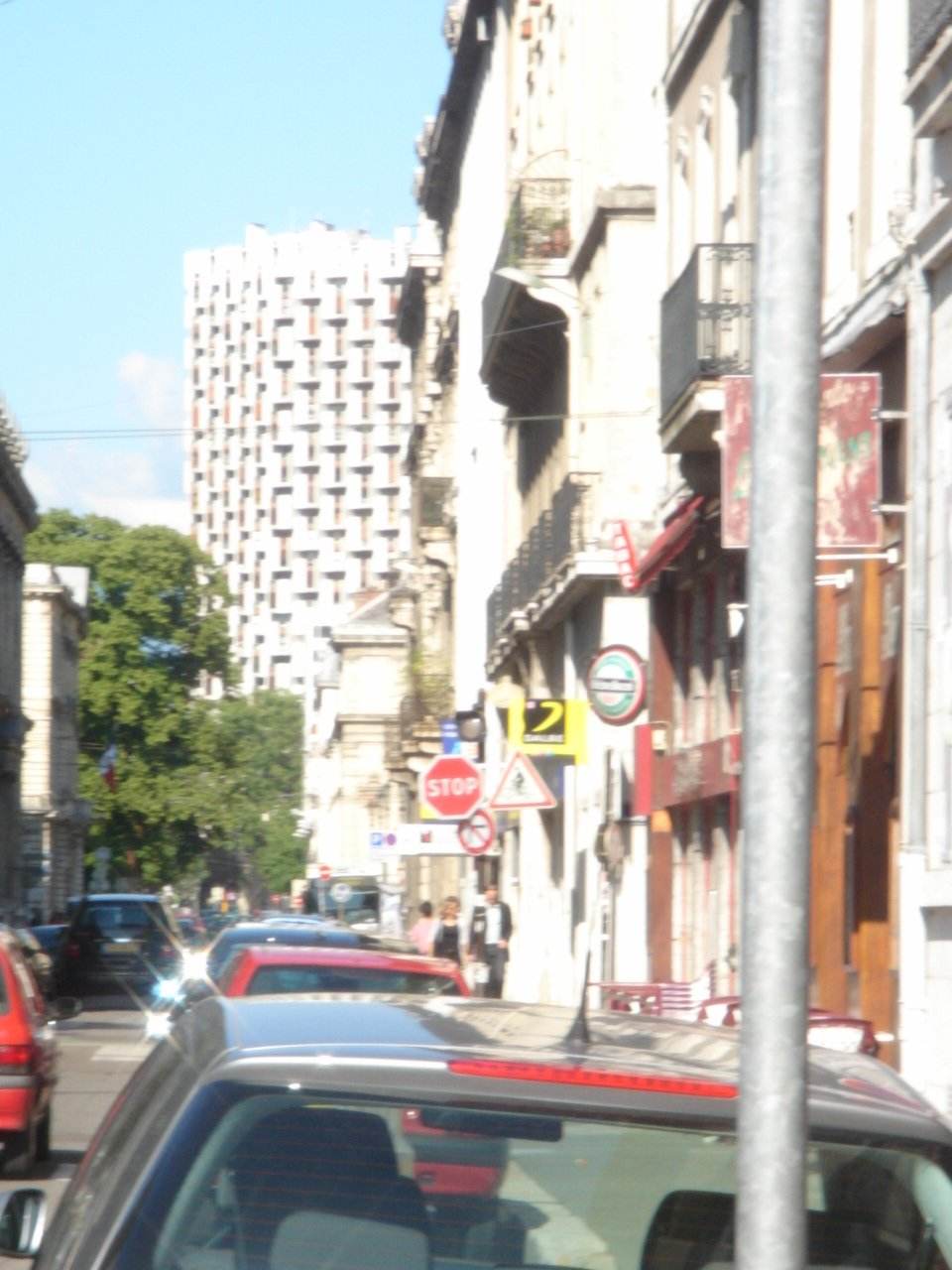
One of the towers seen from downtown

== Saint Roch Cemetery ==
In the Ile Verte district, Saint Roch Cemetery is not the oldest cemetery in Grenoble, but it is the first that was opened by the city and intended for all residents. It was inaugurated in 1810 and took its name from the nearby Saint Roch chapel. It is still in use, augmented in 1941 by the cemetery of the Grand Sablon at La Tronche, on the other side of the Isère.

Some of the funerary monuments have real artistic value, among them the works of Grenoble sculptors Victor Sappey and Henri Ding.
