= Auroville =

Experimental township in Villupuram district and Puducherry, South India

Auroville Aurore (French)
- Town
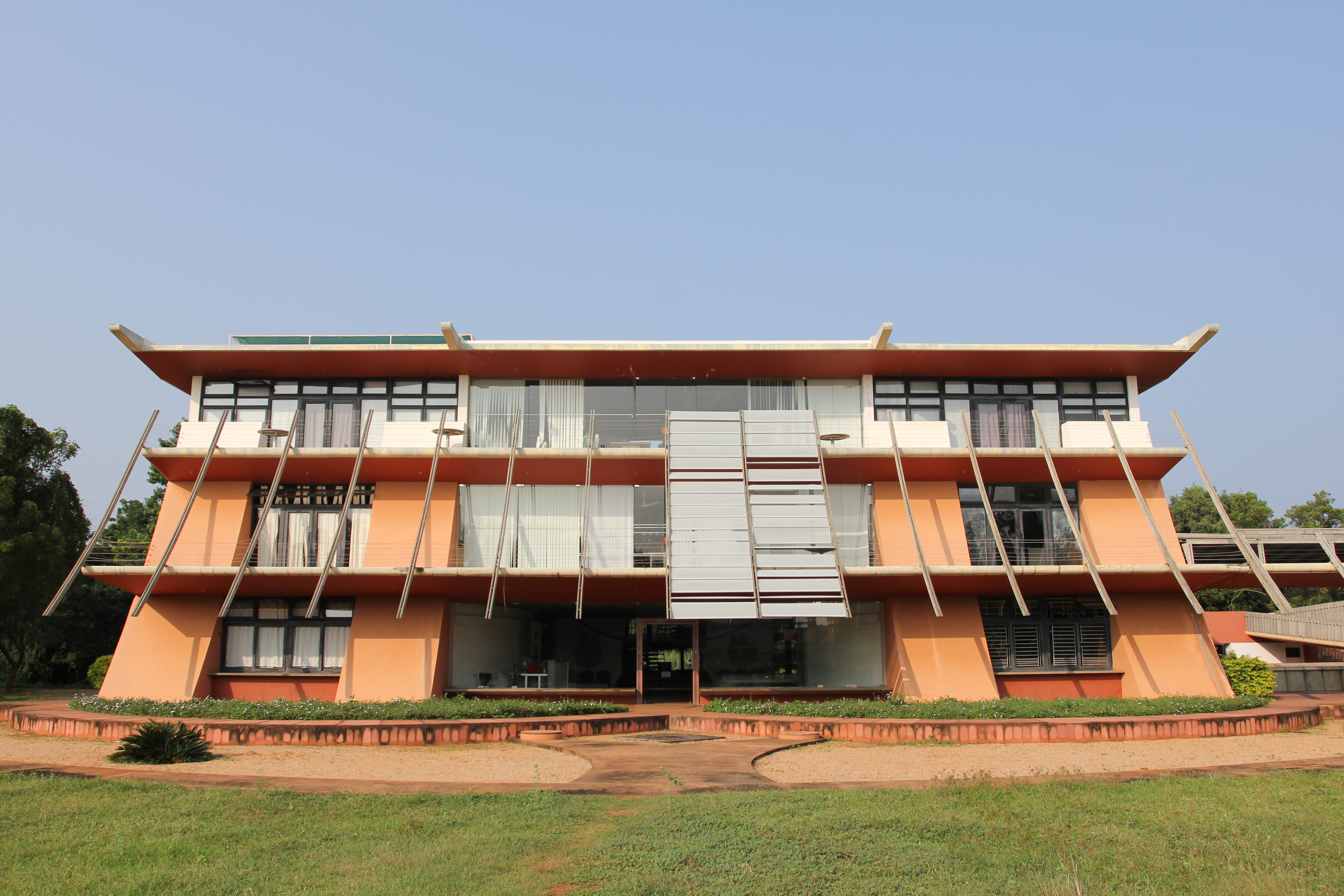
- Town hall of Auroville

- Seal
- Nickname: City of Dawn
- Location within Tamil Nadu
- Coordinates: 12°0′25″N 79°48′38″E
- Country: India
- State: Tamil Nadu
- District: Puducherry
- Established: 1968
- Founder: Mirra Alfassa
- Named for: Sri Aurobindo

Government
  - Type: Self-governance in collaboration with the Government of India
  - Body: Resident's assembly

Population (2021)
  - Total: 3,300
- Demonym(s): Aurovilian, Aurovillienne
- Time zone: UTC+5:30 (IST)
- Postal code: 605101
- Telephone code: 0413
- Vehicle registration: TN-16, PY-01
- Website: www.auroville.org

Auroville (/ˈɔːrəvɪl/; City of Dawn French: Cité de l'aube) is an experimental township in Viluppuram district, mostly in the state of Tamil Nadu, India, with some parts in the Union Territory of Puducherry in India. It was founded in 1968 by Mirra Alfassa (known as "the Mother" or "La Mère") and designed by architect Roger Anger.

== Etymology ==
Auroville's name is derived from the French language: aurore, meaning "dawn", and ville, meaning "town" or "city". Additionally, it is named after Sri Aurobindo (1872–1950).

== History ==
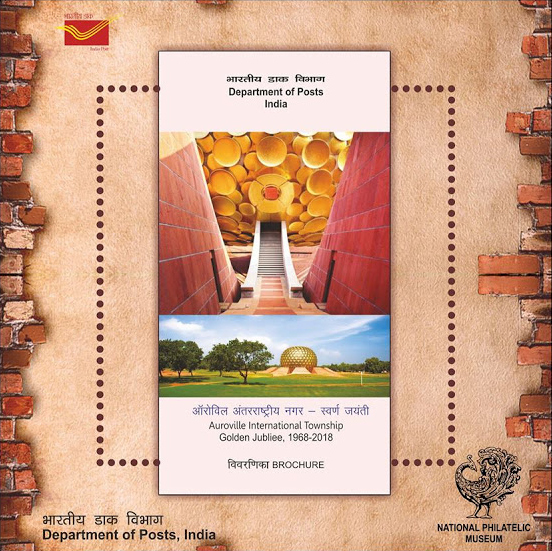
2018 stamp sheet of India dedicated to the 50th anniversary of Auroville

At its Annual Conference in 1964 and with Mirra Alfassa as its Executive President, the Sri Aurobindo Society in Puducherry passed a resolution for the establishment of a city dedicated to the vision of Sri Aurobindo. Alfassa was the spiritual collaborator of Sri Aurobindo, who believed that "man is a transitional being." Alfassa expected that this experimental "universal township" would contribute significantly to the "progress of humanity towards its splendid future by bringing together people of goodwill and aspiration for a better world". Alfassa also believed that such a universal township would contribute decisively to the Indian renaissance.

Alfassa's first public message in 1965 stated:

Greetings from Auroville to all men of good will.

Are invited to Auroville all those who thirst for progress and aspire to a higher and truer life.

Auroville wants to be a universal town where men and women of all countries will be able to live in peace and progressive harmony, above all creeds, all politics and all nationalities. The purpose of Auroville is to realise Human Unity

— Mirra Alfassa

=== Site ===
A site, approximately 20 square kilometres of a desertified plateau some 10 km north of Pondicherry and 5 km from the coast, was chosen for the city.

=== Inauguration ===
The inauguration ceremony, which was attended by delegates from 124 nations, was held on Wednesday, 28 February 1968. Handwritten in French by Alfassa (the "Mother"), its four-point charter set forth her vision of "integral living":

Auroville belongs to nobody in particular. Auroville belongs to humanity as a whole. But to live in Auroville, one must be the willing servitor of the Divine Consciousness.

Auroville will be the place of an unending education, of constant progress, and a youth that never ages. Auroville wants to be the bridge between the past and the future. Taking advantage of all discoveries from without and from within, Auroville will boldly spring toward future realizations. Auroville will be a site of material and spiritual researches for a living embodiment of an actual human unity.

== The Matrimandir ==
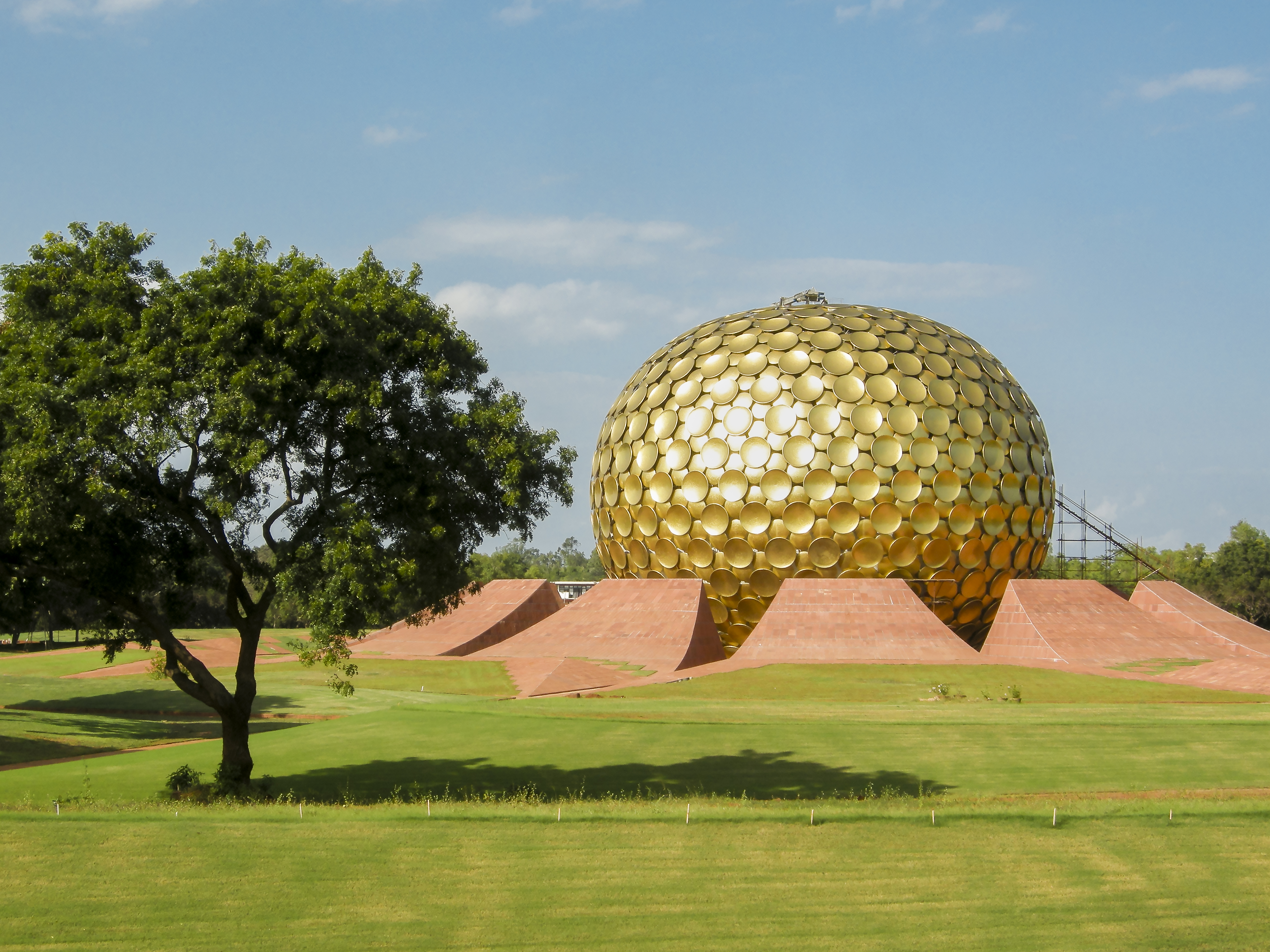
The Matrimandir, a golden metallic sphere in the center of town

In the middle of the town is the Matrimandir, which Alfassa conceived as "a symbol of the Divine's answer to man's aspiration for perfection". Silence is maintained inside the Matrimandir to ensure the tranquility of the space, and the entire area surrounding the Matrimandir is called the "Peace area". Inside the Matrimandir, a spiraling ramp leads upwards to an air-conditioned chamber of polished white marble, which is referred to as "a place to find one's consciousness".

Matrimandir is surrounded by manicured gardens and equipped with a solar power plant. When there is no sunlight, the sunray on the globe is replaced by a beam from a solar-powered light.

Radiating from this center are four "zones" of the city: the "Residential Zone", "Industrial Zone", "Cultural (& Educational) Zone" and "International Zone". Around the city lies a Green Belt, an environmental research and resource area that includes farms and forestries, a botanical garden, a seed bank, medicinal and herbal plants, water catchment bunds, and some communities.

== Legal status and government ==
Prior to 1980, the Sri Aurobindo Society legally owned all of the city's assets. In 1980, the Government of India passed the Auroville Emergency Provision Act 1980, under which it took over the city's management. The change was initiated after Mirra Alfassa died in 1973, and serious fissures developed between the Society and the city's residents in its day-to-day management. The residents appealed to Indira Gandhi, then Prime Minister of India, for an intervention. The Society challenged the government's action in the Supreme Court of India. The final verdict upheld the constitutional validity of the government's action and intervention.

In 1988, after the verdict, a need was felt to make a lasting arrangement for the long-term management of Auroville. The city's representatives, along with Kireet Joshi, then Educational Advisor to the Union government, met for consultations with then-prime minister Rajiv Gandhi. Later that year, the Auroville Foundation Act 1988, was passed by the Indian Parliament. The Act stipulated the vesting of all movable and immovable assets of the city in a foundation known as Auroville Foundation and creating a three-tier governing system: the Governing Board, the Residents' Assembly, and the Auroville International Advisory Council. The Governing Board selected by the Indian government consists of seven prominent Indians in education, culture, environment, and social service in the areas of Auroville's ideals. The International Advisory Council is composed of five members also selected by the government who have rendered valuable service to humanity in the areas of Auroville's ideals. The Residents' Assembly consists of all official residents of the city. All three governing bodies are meant to work in harmony and collaborate to accomplish the ideals of Auroville as mentioned in the charter, as per processes defined in the Auroville Foundation Act.

The Auroville Foundation is an autonomous body under the Ministry of Human Resource Development (HRD). The HRD ministry appoints the seven members of the Governing Board and the five members of the International Advisory Council. There is also a secretary to the Foundation, appointed by the government, who resides in Auroville and has an office with supporting staff. The Foundation currently owns about half of the total land required for the township. The remaining lands are being purchased whenever funds are available.

=== Chairmen throughout the years ===
- Karan Singh – former Union Minister, 1991
- M. S. Swaminathan – agricultural scientist
- Kireet Joshi – former Special Educational Advisor to the Government of India
- R. N. Ravi – Governor of Tamil Nadu

== Society and population ==
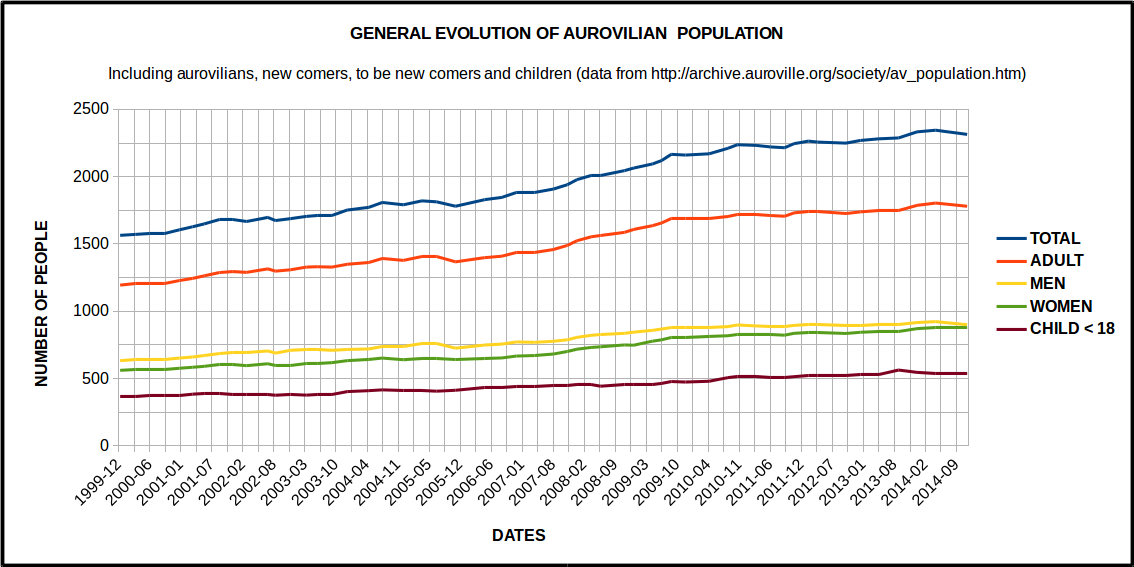
General evolution of Aurovilian population

In the initial 20 years, about 400 individuals from 20 countries resided in the township. In the next 20 years, this number rose to 2,000 individuals from 40 countries. As of January 2018, it has 2,814 residents (2,127 adults and 687 children) from 54 countries with around 50% from India, and almost 20% from both France and Germany. The community had many residential housing clusters with Tamil, English, French and Sanskrit names like Aspiration, Arati, La Ferme, Auromodel and Isaiambalam.

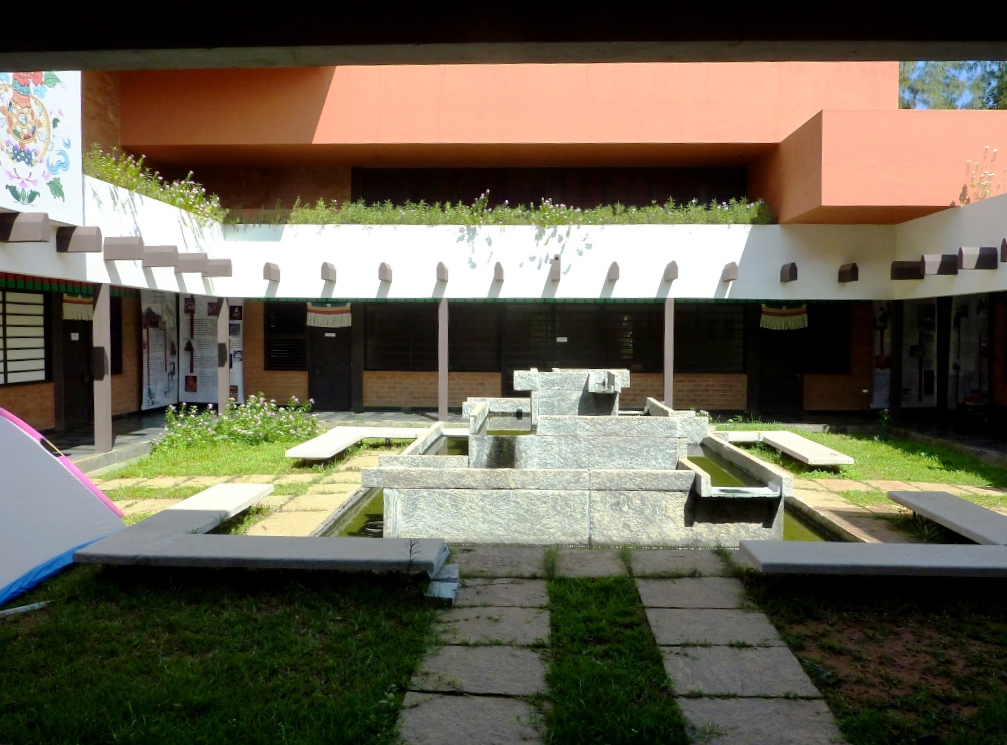
Courtyard of the Tibetan Centre, Auroville

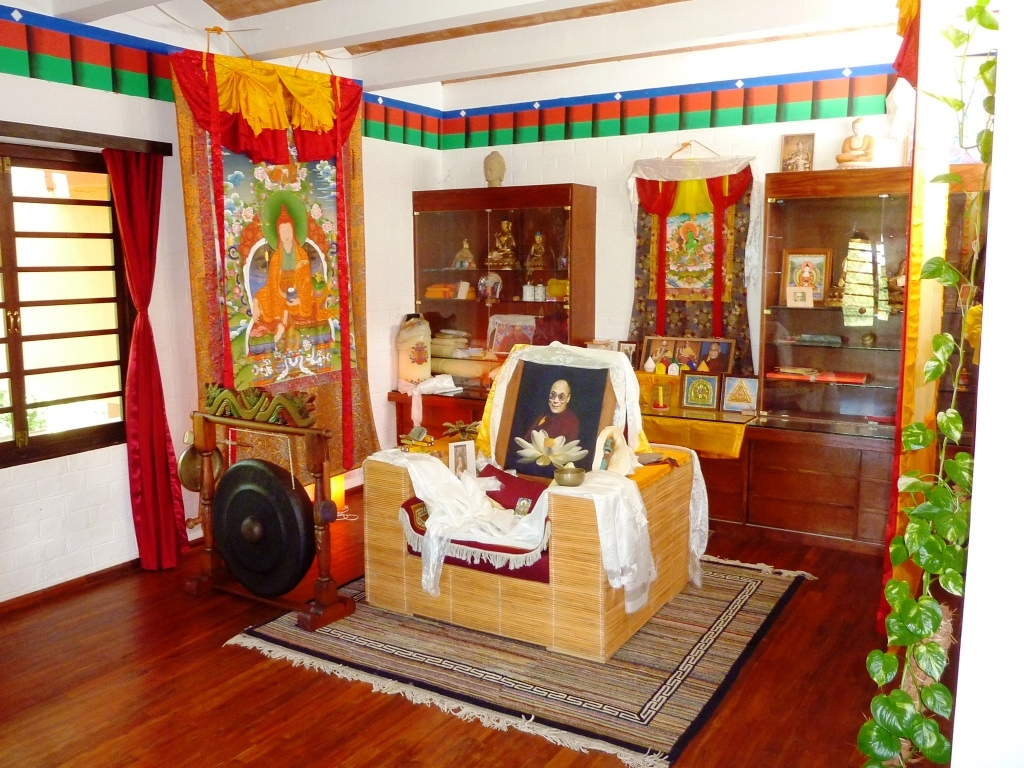
Dalai Lama's seat, Tibetan Centre, Auroville

=== Demographics ===
The population break-down:

Nationality	Dec 2026
Indian	1888
French	413
German	233
Italian	161
Dutch	106
American	117
Russian	82
Spanish	65
British	66
Swiss	41
Israeli	50
Belgian	43
South Korean	52
Swedish	24
Canadian	26
Ukrainian	22
Australian	19
Austrian	12
Japanese	13
South African	13
Chinese (excluding Tibetan)	16
Argentinian	9
Hungarian	8
Slovenian	6
Mexican	6
Nepalese	6
Brazilian	12
Latvian	4
Belarusian	4
Tibetan	2
Ethiopian	3
Sri Lankan	3
Bulgarian	2
Moldovan	1
Icelandic	1
Colombian	5
Rwandan	2
Irish	2
Czech	1
Filipino	2
Danish	5
Taiwanese	2
Ecuadorian	1
Egyptian	1
Algerian	1
Finnish	2
Iranian	9
Kazakh	4
Lithuanian	2
Chilean	2
Macedonian	4
Norwegian	2
Portuguese	2
Croatian	1
Indonesian	1
Luxembourger	1
Polish	1
Sudanese	1
Romanian	1

=== Surrounding villages ===
Auroville works closely together with the surrounding villages, where mainly Tamil people reside, via the Auroville Village Action Trust under which many different projects including the villages fall. The biggest one under the trust is the Auroville Village Action Group (AVAG), which has programs for women's empowerment, education, and financial support and also sells its own products in the name of AVAL, Surya, and Kudumbam as social enterprise work. Other activities falling under the trust are the Life Education Centre, Auroville Industrial School, Mohanam cultural centre, Auroville Health Services, Deepam school for disabled children, Thamarai community centre, Martuvam Healing forest, and the Reach for the Stars! program enabling higher education for village youth. Concerns exist because of violence allegedly caused by criminal elements entering from the surrounding villages.

== Economy ==
Instead of paper and coin currency, residents are given account numbers to connect to their central account. Visitors are requested to get a temporary account and an Aurocard, a special debit card for its citizens.

Residents of Auroville are expected to make a monthly contribution to the community. They are asked to help the community whenever possible by work, money, or kind. The "guest contribution", or a daily fee paid by the guests of Auroville, constitutes a part of Auroville's budget. There is a system of "maintenance", whereby those Aurovilians in need can receive from the community monthly maintenance which covers simple basic needs of life. Auroville's economy and its overall life are of an evolving nature and there are ongoing experiments to reach closer to the vision.

The Government of India only finances a small amount of Auroville's budget, which is mainly formed by contributions from Auroville's commercial units which contribute 33% of their profits to Auroville's Central Fund and by donations, largely foreign, from Auroville's multiple international bases set up all over the world. There are guest houses, building construction units, information technology, small and medium scale businesses, producing and re-selling items such as handmade paper for stationery items, organic food, as well as producing its well-known incense sticks, which can be bought in Auroville's own shop in Puducherry. They are also sold online in India and abroad. Each of these units contributes a considerable part of their profits to the township. Over 5,000 people, mostly from the nearby localities, are employed in various sections and units of Auroville.

Other activities include afforestation, organic agriculture, basic educational research, health care, village development, appropriate technology, town planning, water table management, cultural activities, and community services.

== Location ==
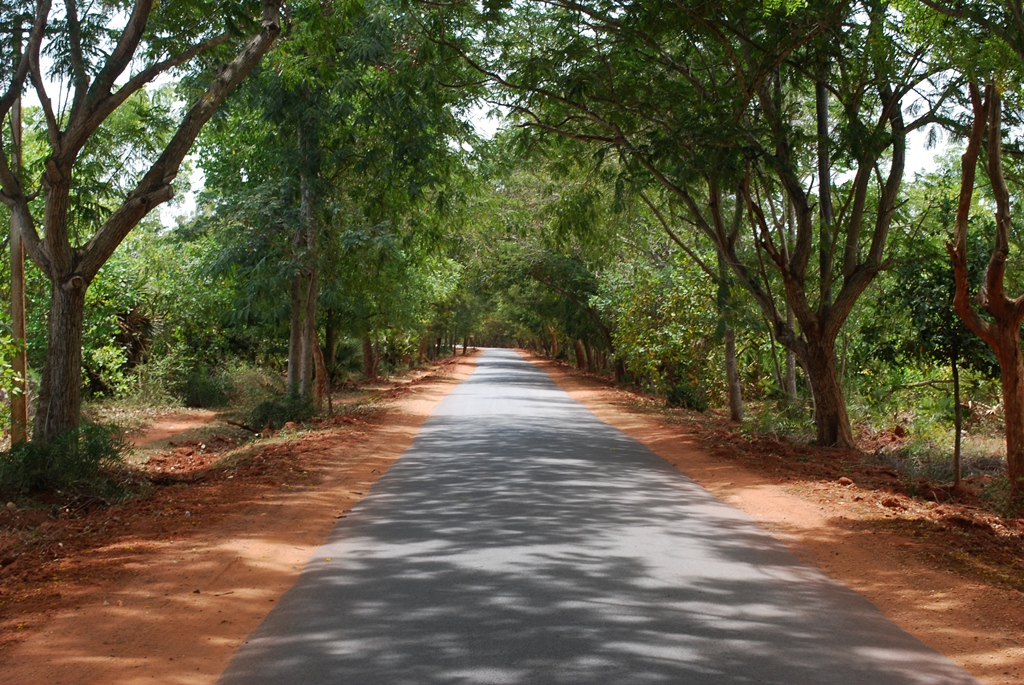
Auroville Main Road

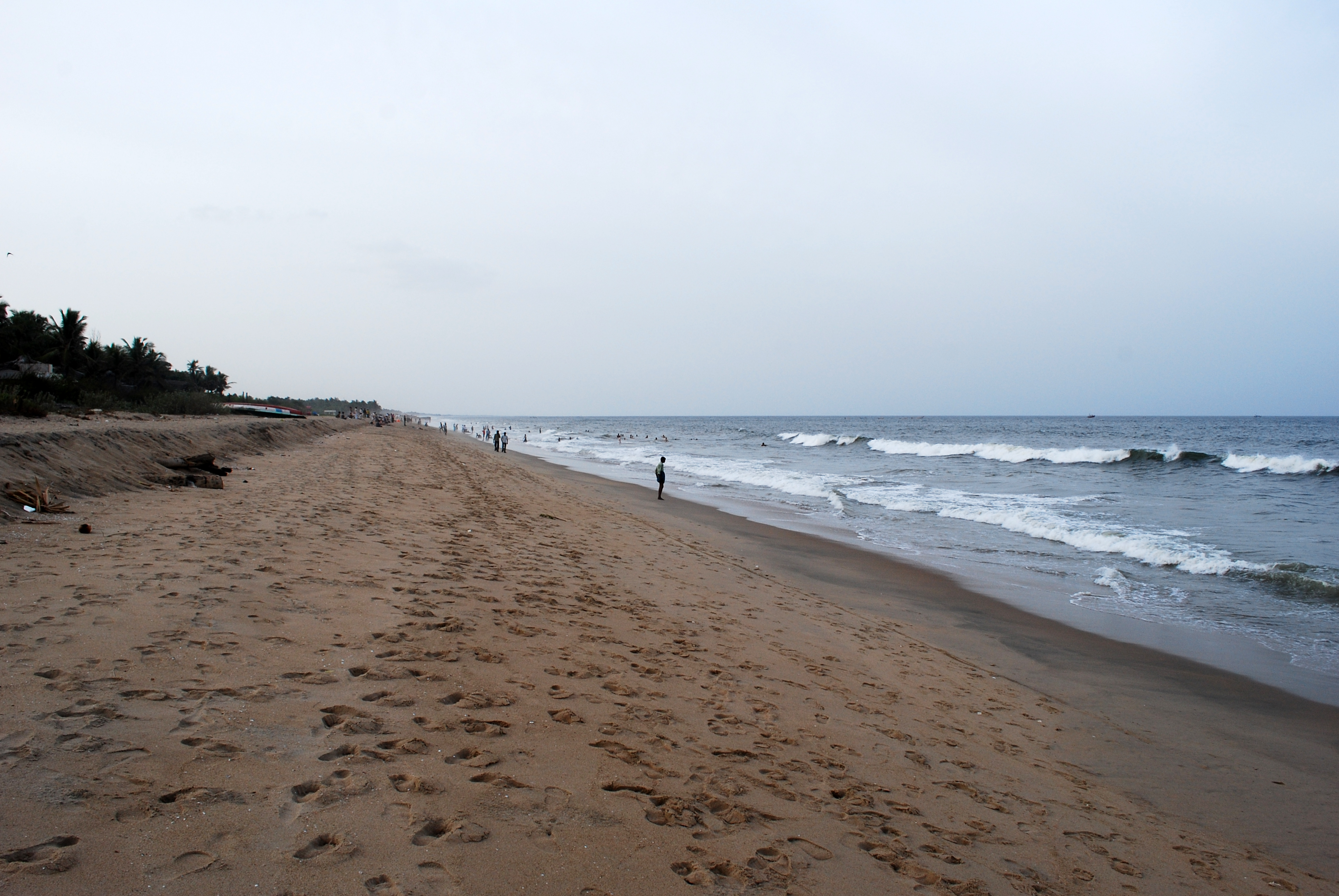
Auro Beach

Auroville is composed of a cluster of properties some 12 km (7.5 mi) north of Pondicherry. It can be easily reached via the East Coast Road (ECR) which connects Chennai and Pondicherry. The visitor center and Matrimandir can be reached by traveling 6 km (3.7 mi) westwards from the signposted turnoff at the ECR Bommayapalayam. Turning east leads directly to Auroville's private beach called Repos, several hundred meters away. Pondicherry University is very near to auroville.

== Climate ==
It is included in the sub-humid tropics (wet-and-dry tropical climate) situated on a plateau region with its maximum elevation of 32 m (105 ft) above sea level located in the Matrimandir area. The annual rainfall average is 1,200 mm (47 in) mainly from the SW monsoon (June to Sept.) and NE monsoon (Nov to Dec) with a dry period of approx 6 months. The average maximum temperature is 32.2 °C (90.0 °F), average minimum 20 °C (68 °F).

== Communications and media ==
The Auroville website provides open as well as restricted forums for various projects, interests, organizations, and outreach which make up the life of the community. The opinions expressed in these publications are not necessarily those of the community at large. The Auroville radio website provides recordings and daily news covering local events. Auroville also has an internal MediaInterface, formerly OutreachMedia, team to regulate visits of journalists and film/video makers, which has served the community for many decades. Their aim is to ensure that all journalists and filmmakers get official, up-to-date information and representative footage from reliable sources.

== BBC child abuse investigation ==
In May 2008, the BBC produced a 10-minute Newsnight film about Auroville, which was aired on BBC Two. A short version was aired on Radio 4's From Our Own Correspondent. It also appeared on BBC Online. The reports contrasted the idealism of its founders with allegations by some people that the community tolerates paedophiles, especially in a school that Auroville has established for local village children.

Auroville filed an official complaint to the BBC that the report was biased, untrue and contravened BBC editorial ethical guidelines. After investigations, Ofcom did not uphold the complaint.

== Controversial development plans ==
On 4 December 2021, local police, joined by a group of outsiders, began demolishing the Auroville Youth Centre – uprooting the surrounding trees with the help of earthmovers. Despite the protests by the residents, on 5 December more than 900 trees were bulldozed across 67 acres in Auroville. An internal petition signed by more than 500 Auroville residents requested postponement of the development work on the Crown Road ‘Right of Way’, until the Auroville community could arrive at a collective agreement on a practical way forward. An application filed by some residents of Auroville against the ongoing illegal clearing of forests by the Auroville Foundation led the Southern Bench of the National Green Tribunal (NGT) of India to order an interim stay on felling of trees on 17 December 2021. This ban against tree felling inside Auroville was extended by the NGT until the next court hearing on 3 January. The verdict was announced on 28 April 2022, which directed the Auroville Foundation Office to prepare a proper township plan and apply for Environmental Clearance (EC) under Item 8 (b) of the EIA Notification, 2006. Till then they were directed not to proceed with further construction in the project area with the exception of ets the completion of the crown road given a Joint Committee comprising officials in forest, wildlife, and state departments inspect the area in question and the Auroville Foundation Office undertake the crown road work in the remaining stretches where there are no trees.

== 50th anniversary ==
By occasion of the 50th anniversary of Auroville on 28 February 2018 the Indian President Ram Nath Kovind sent a message to the community in which he called Sri Aurobindo "one of modern India's greatest sages". He also wrote that Auroville "represents humanity's aspiration for peace and goodwill" and that it is "a unique symbol of human unity".

Prime Minister Narendra Modi visited the Sri Aurobindo Ashram and Auroville on 25 February 2018. After a meditation in the Matrimandir and participation in some functions he gave a speech in the Sri Aurobindo Auditorium. He referred to the Auroville Charter and the basic principles of life in the community. Then he said, "Indian society is fundamentally diverse. It has fostered dialogue and a philosophic tradition. Auroville showcases this ancient Indian tradition to the world by bringing together global diversity." At the end of his speech, he expressed his wish that Auroville may continue developing and supporting new and creative ideas for India and the whole world.

== In popular culture ==
At present, any filming within and about Auroville requires land permission from the Government of India. Many filmmakers visit Auroville, and a wide range of films are available. These include

- Ever Slow Green - Re-afforestation in Auroville, South India, full length, 56 minutes, 2020
- City of the Dawn, full length, 80 minutes, 2010
- Auroville, the outline of a world, full length, 25 minutes, 2009
- Auroville – A Dream of the Divine (part 1 and 2), full length, 20 minutes in two parts, 2003
- Spiritual journey... Auroville (Духовное путешествие... Ауровиль), six 25-minute videos on Auroville by Russian filmmakers, 2013
- The India Trip full length, 49 minutes, from the National Film Board of Canada, 1971
- Auroville topics can also be heard on Auroville Radio, and the films about Auroville screened at the biennial Auroville Film Festival.

== Gallery ==
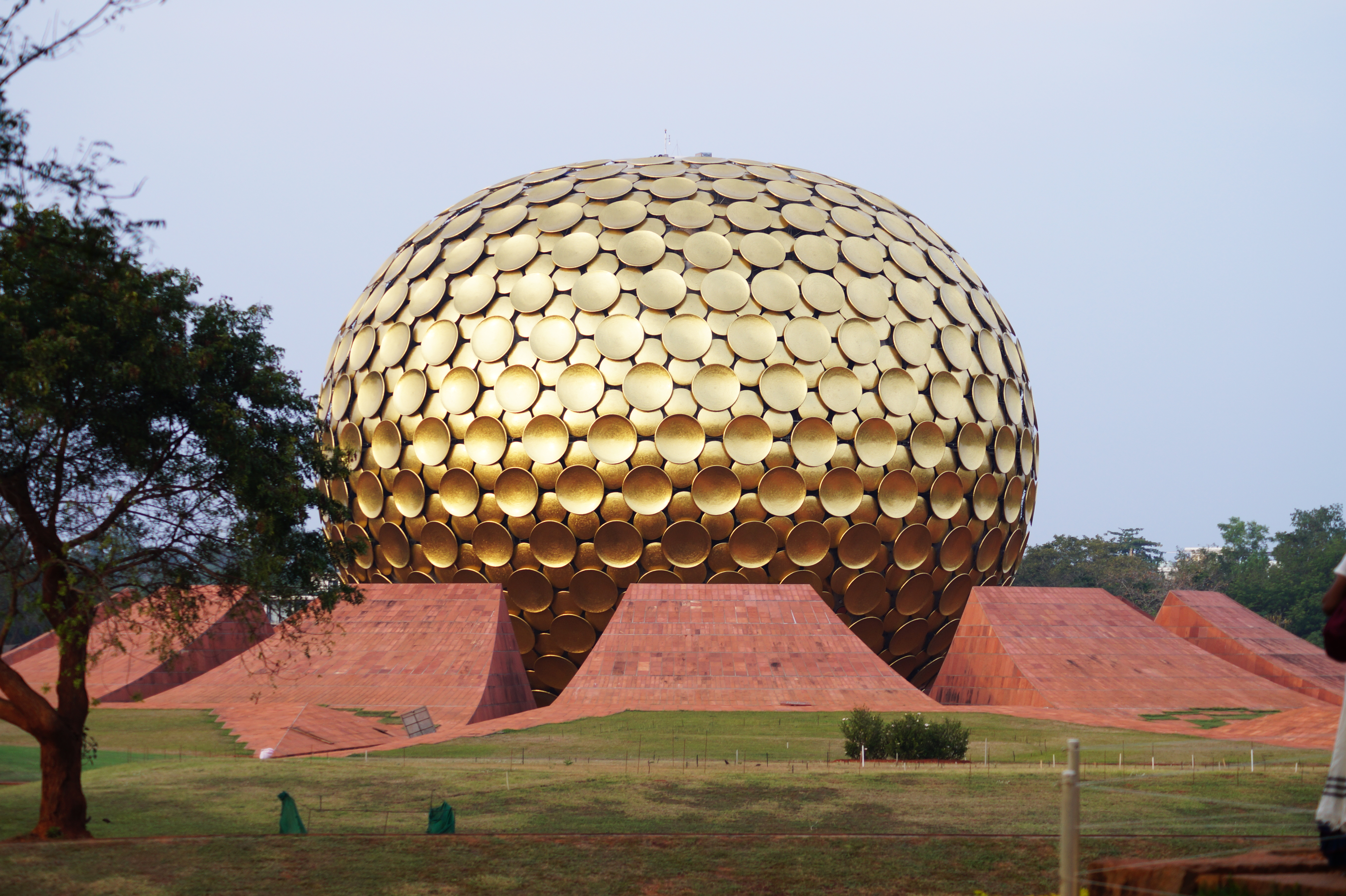
A close view of Auroville Matri Mandir in Puducherry

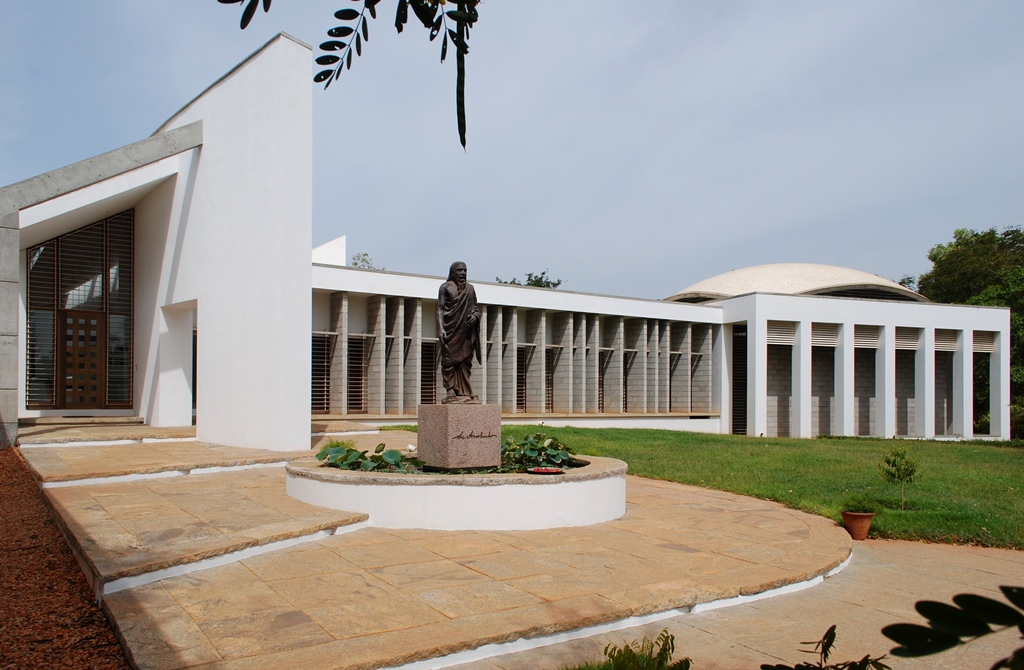
Savitri Bhawan

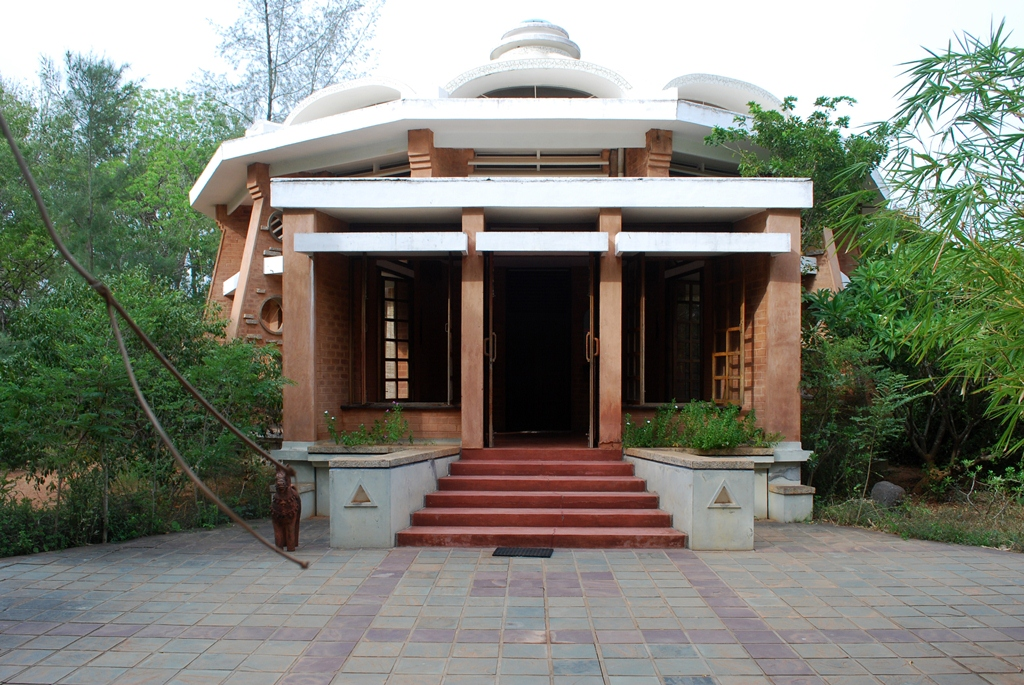
Vérité Learning Centre

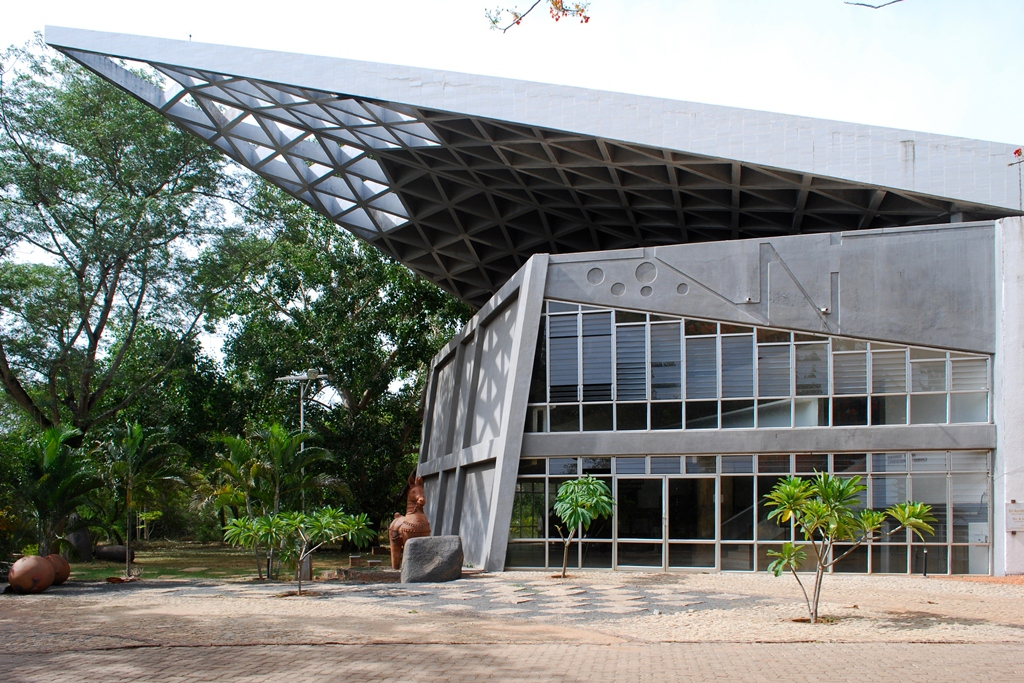
Bharat Niwas

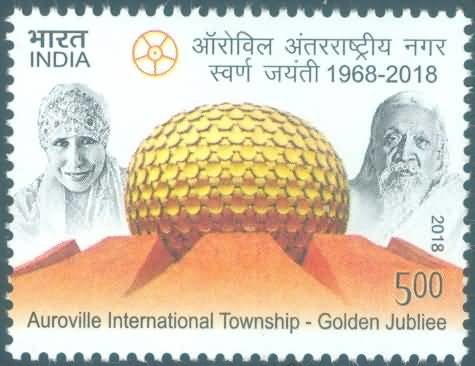
Stamp of India 2018 50th Anniversary of Auroville

== See also ==
- Auroville Marathon
- Arcosanti
- Sacromonte
- Planned Community

== Bibliography ==
English

- Abundance Publications. The Auroville Handbook.Pondicherry: All-India Press, 2007.
- Auroville – Development Perspectives 1993–1998 – An Invitation To Participate, Typoscript, Autoren/Hrsg. Auroville Development Group, Bharat–Nivas, Auroville 1993, no ISBN
- K. M. Agarwala (Hrsg.): Auroville – The City Of Dawn, Sri Aurobindo Center New Delhi 1996, no ISBN
- Auroville References in Mother's Agenda, Auroville Press, Auroville, no Y., no ISBN
- Jerome Clayton Glenn: Linking the Future: Findhorn, Auroville Arcosanti, published by Hexiad Project/ Center on Technology and Society, Cambridge, Massachusetts 1979, no ISBN
- Anupama Kundoo: Roger Anger, Research on Beauty, Architecture 1953–2008, JOVIS Verlag Berlin 2009, ISBN 978-3-86859-006-7
- Peter Richards: Experience!Auroville – Guide Book for Guests and Visitors, Pondicherry 2000, no ISBN
- Savitra: Auroville: Sun-Word Rising – A Trust For The Earth, published by The Community of Auroville, Auroville 1980, no ISBN
- The Auroville Adventure – Selections from ten years of Auroville Today, published by Auroville Today, Auroville 1998, no ISBN
- The Auroville Experience – Selections from 202 issues of Auroville Today, November 1988 to November 2005, published by Auroville Today, Auroville 2006, no ISBN
- Jessica Namakkal, European Dreams, Tamil Land: Auroville and the Paradox of a Postcolonial Utopia, in Journal for the Study of Radicalism, Volume 6, Number 1, Spring 2012, pp. 59–88 (Published by Michigan State University Press)
- Koduvayur Venkitaraman, Abhishek; Joshi, Neelakshi (2022). "A critical examination of a community-led ecovillage initiative: a case of Auroville, India". Climate Action. 1 (1): 15. Bibcode:2022CliAc...1...15K. doi:10.1007/s44168-022-00016-3.
- Xavier Pavie« Encouraging Young People to Develop Social Entrepreneurship in a Community the Case of Auroville ». Case center, reference n°320-0123-1. ESSEC Business School 2020.
- Xavier Pavie« Auroville, from utopia to responsible innovation: from the emergence of a utopian community to the development of entrepreneurial initiatives ». Case center, reference n°819-0026-1. ESSEC Business School 2019.

German

- Mira Alfassa: Die Mutter über Auroville, Auropublikations (Hrsg.), Sri Aurobindo Ashram Trust, Pondicherry 1978, no ISBN
- Alan G. (Hrsg.): Auroville – Ein Traum nimmt Gestalt an, o.O. (vermutlich Auroville/ Pondicherry) 1996, 1. dt. Aufl., no ISBN
- Juergen Axer: Integrale Erziehung – Ein pädagogisches Konzept auf der Grundlage der Philosophie Sri Aurobindo's, Dissertation Universität Köln. Verlag Wissenschaft und Politik, Köln 1983, ISBN 3-8046-8621-4
- Michael Klostermann: Auroville – Stadt des Zukunftsmenschen; Fischer Taschenbuch Verlag, Frankfurt/M., Februar 1976; ISBN 3-436-02254-3
- Renate Börger: Auroville – Eine Vision blüht, Verlag Connection Medien, Niedertaufkirchen 2004, 3. veränderte Aufl., ISBN 3-928248-01-4
