= Matrimandir =

Spiritual building in Tamil Nadu, India

- Auroville Matri Mandir
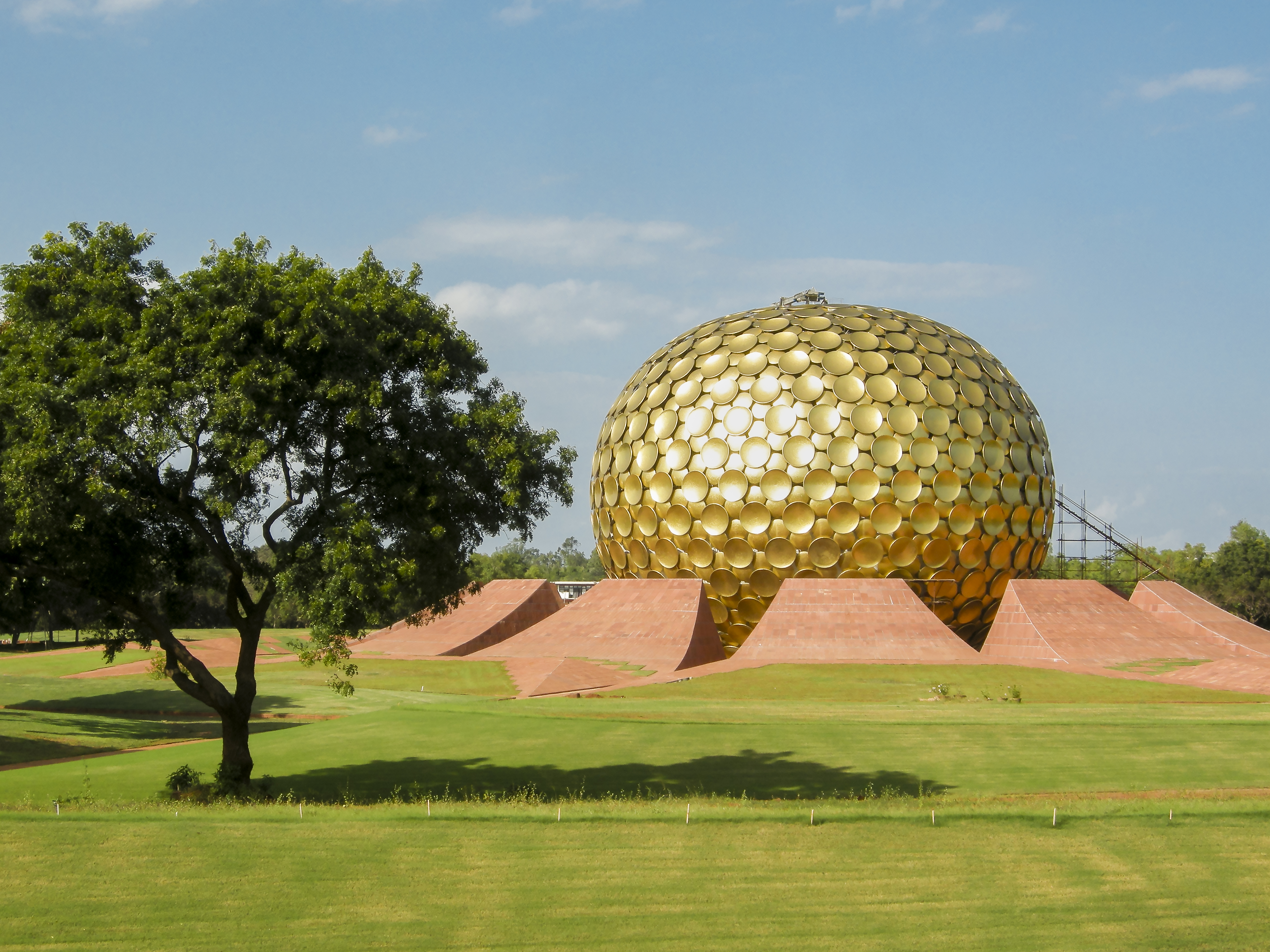
- Matrimandir
- Interactive map of the Matrimandir area

General information
- Type: stainless steel sphere gold plated
- Architectural style: spherical
- Location: Auroville, Tamil Nadu, India
- Coordinates: 12.007208°N 79.810658°E
- Groundbreaking: 21 February 1971
- Completed: February 2008
- Cost: 1250 crores

Height
- Height: 23.5 m (77 ft)

Design and construction
- Architects: Mirra Alfassa; Roger Anger

Website
- Description of the Matrimandir from Auroville's website

The Matrimandir is an edifice of spiritual significance for practitioners of integral yoga in the centre of Auroville, India established by Mirra Alfassa of the Sri Aurobindo Ashram, Auroville's spiritual co-founder, known to her followers as The Mother or La Mère. It is called Soul of the City (French: L'âme de la Ville) and situated in a large open space called "Paix" (French for Peace). The Mandir was conceived of in late 1965 as a gleaming sphere rising amid twelve gardens by, who marked a lone banyan tree as the heart of the city. Its foundation stone was laid at sunrise on her 93rd birthday, 21 February 1971, and the four supporting pillars were concreted on 17 November 1973; she died that evening. After decades of work by Aurovilians and craftsmen, the Inner Chamber opened in 1994 and the gold‑clad sphere was completed in May 2008.

== History ==
The Matrimandir, a "Temple of the Mother" was conceived as a shining sphere rising from twelve surrounding gardens by Alfassa in late 1965, when she designated a lone banyan tree as the city's spiritual center. Its foundation stone was laid on 21 February 1971, and excavation of the 14,000 m³ pit by Aurovilians and hired laborers began three weeks later. Concreting of the four supporting pillars was completed at 7:25 pm on 17 November 1973, coinciding with Alfassa's death, after which construction proceeded steadily. The Inner Chamber opened to visitors in 1994, and the main golden sphere was finished in 2008, with the surrounding twelve gardens and peripheral lake completed later.

== Structure and surroundings ==
The Matrimandir took 37 years to build, from laying the foundation stone at sunrise on 21 February 1971 Alfassa's 93rd birthday to its completion in May 2008. It is in the form of a huge sphere surrounded by twelve petals. Golden discs cover the geodesic dome and reflect sunlight, which gives the structure its characteristic radiance. Inside the central dome is a meditation hall known as the inner chamber. This contains the largest optically perfect glass globe in the world. The Matrimandir and its surrounding gardens in the central "Peace area" are open to the public by appointment.

The four main pillars that support the structure of Matrimandir and carry the inner chamber have been set at the four main directions of the compass. These four pillars are symbolic of and named after the four aspects of Alfassa as described by Sri Aurobindo. The North pillar, Mahakali, represents strength, swiftness, warrior resolve, and overwhelming will; the South pillar, Maheshwari, symbolizes tranquil compassion, boundless wisdom, and majestic calm; the East pillar, Mahalakshmi, reflects intricate opulence, grace, and compelling attraction; and the West pillar, Mahasaraswati, stands for deep knowledge, flawless creativity, and precise perfection.

Four great Aspects of the Mother, four of her leading Powers and Personalities have stood in front in her guidance of this Universe and in her dealings with the terrestrial play

Name	Symbolism
Maheswari (south pillar)	"...her personality of calm wideness and comprehending wisdom and tranquil benignity and inexhaustible compassion and sovereign and surpassing majesty and all-ruling greatness".
Mahakali (north pillar)	"...her power of splendid strength and irresistible passion, her warrior mood, her overwhelming will, her impetuous swiftness and world-shaking force".
Mahalakshmi (east pillar)	"...vivid and sweet and wonderful with her deep secret of beauty and harmony and fine rhythm, her intricate and subtle opulence, her compelling attraction and captivating grace".
Mahasaraswathi (west pillar)	"...equipped with her close and profound capacity of intimate knowledge and careful flawless work and quiet and exact perfection in all things".

== Gallery ==
Matrimandir and the banyan tree, the centre of Auroville

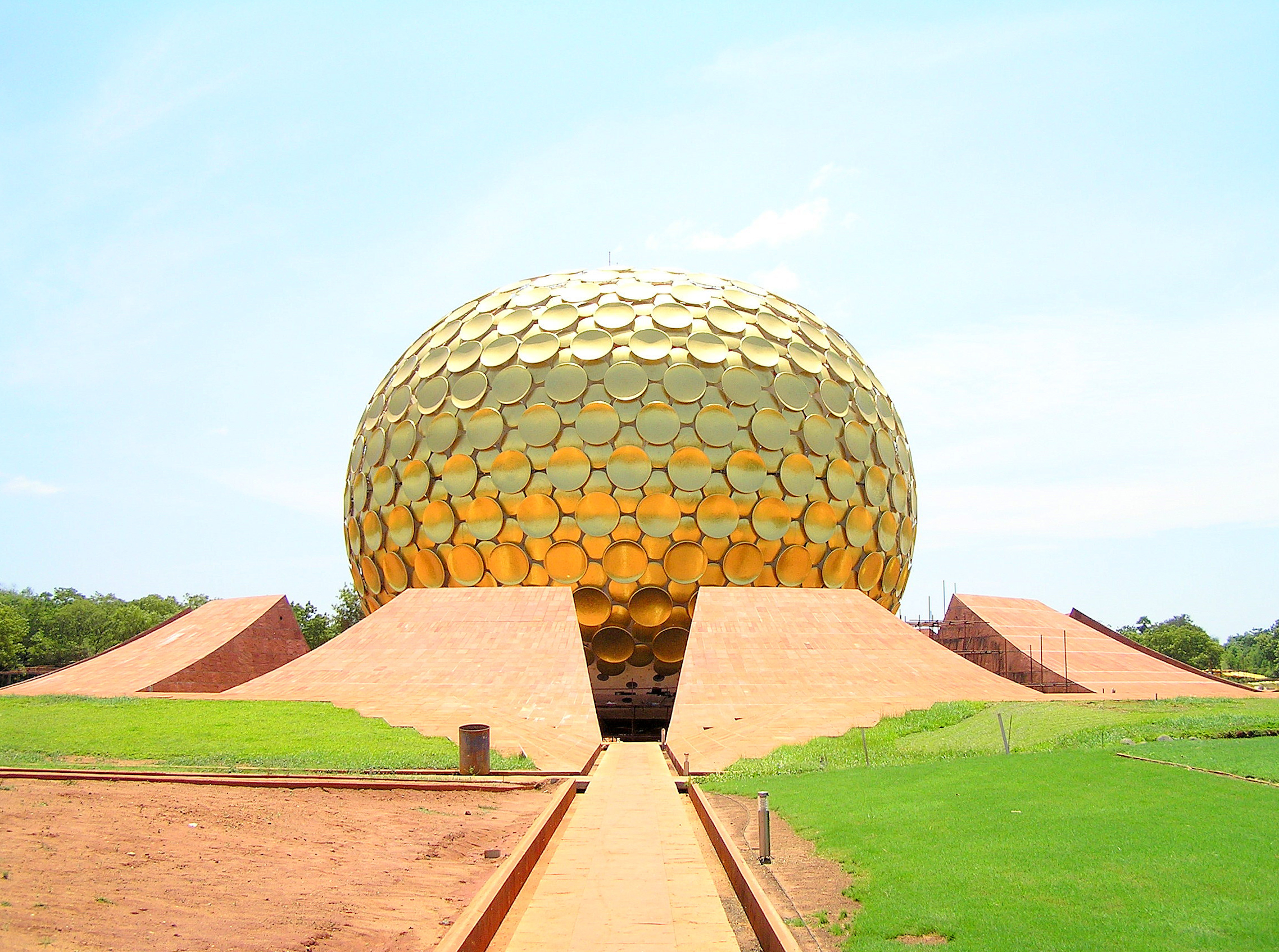
The Matrimandir in Auroville, Tamil Nadu, India

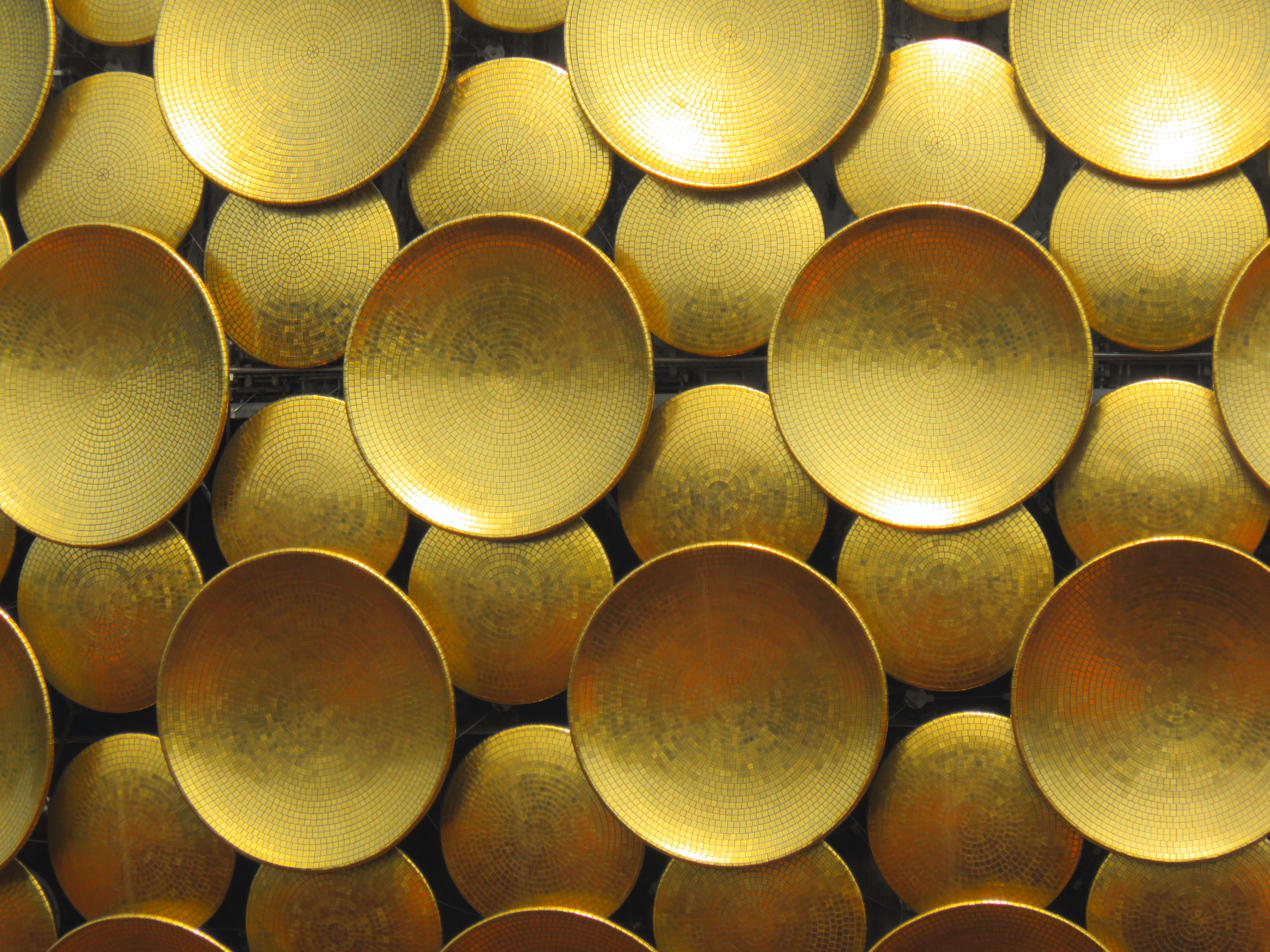
The golden discs that build up the Matrimandir dome

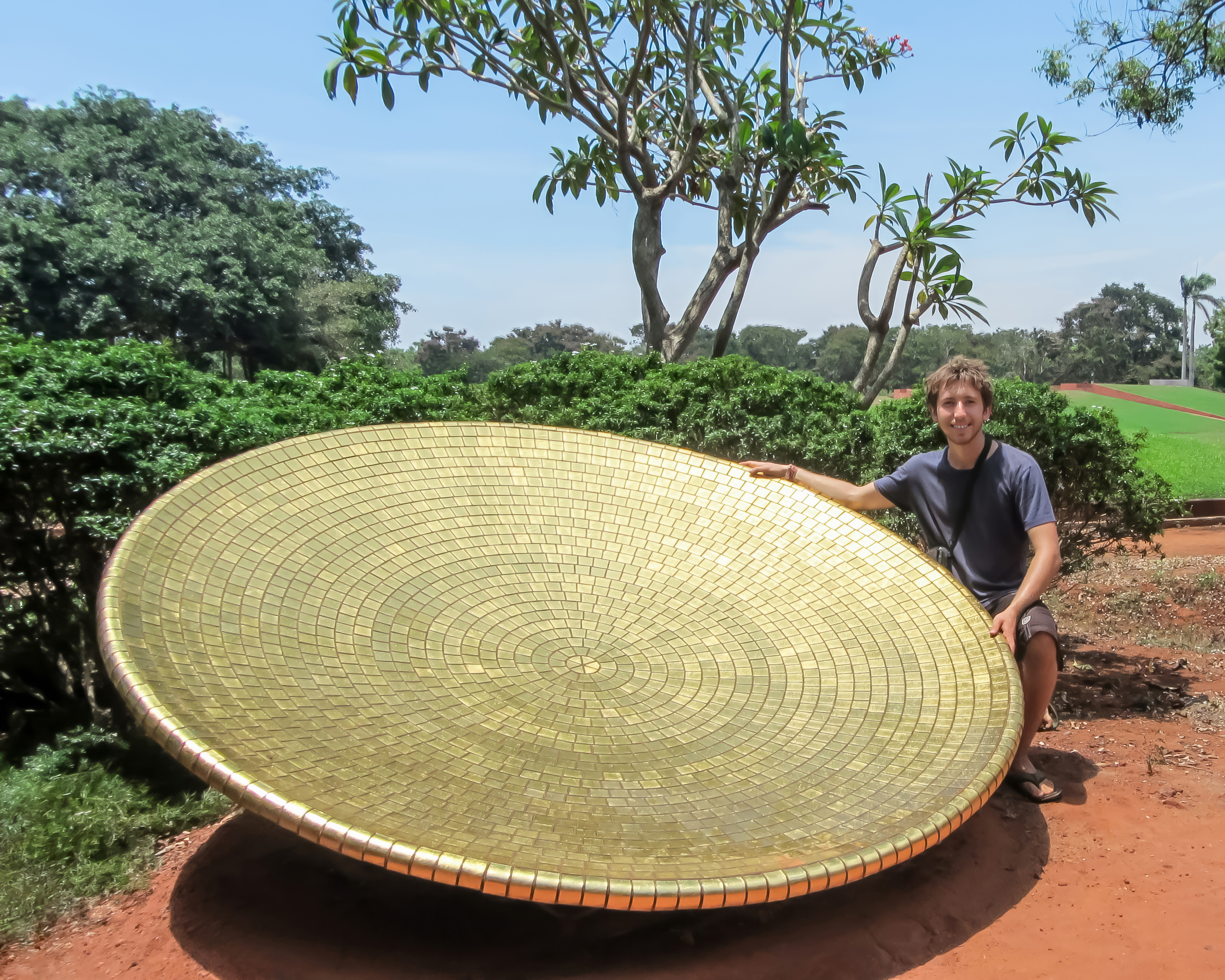
An Auroville volunteer posing next to one of the golden discs used in Matrimandir's dome.

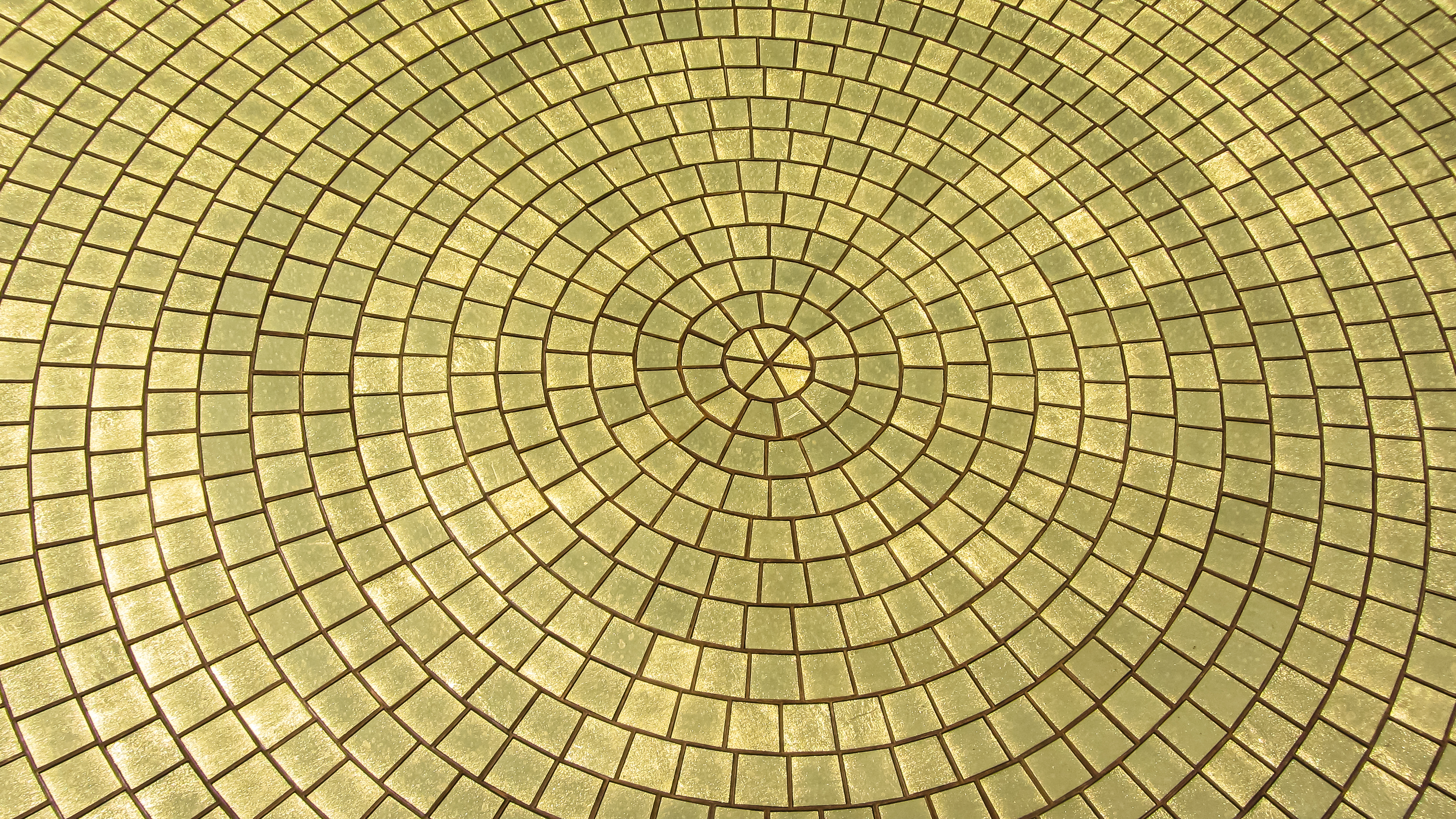
Closeup of one of the golden discs.

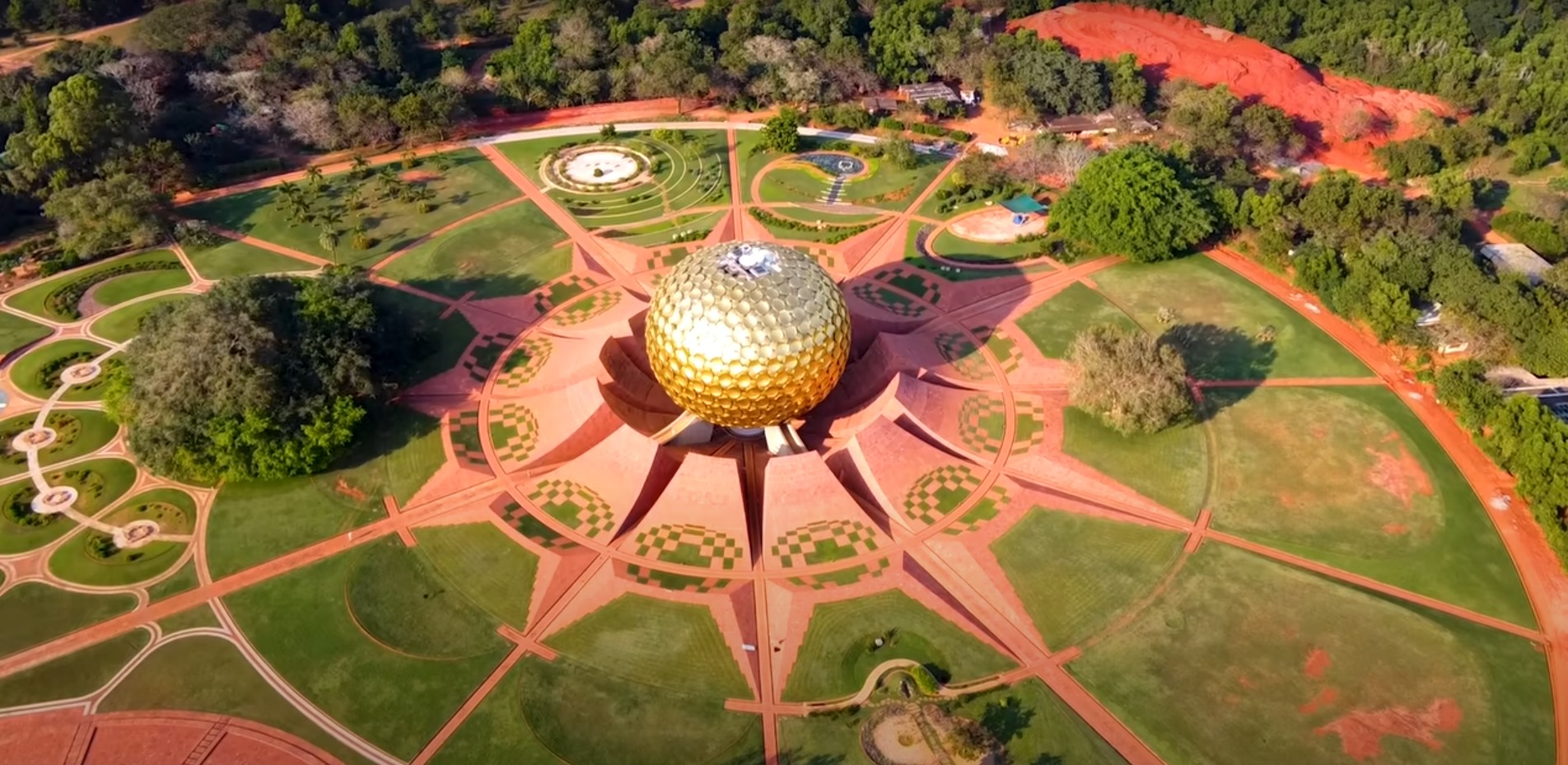
Aerial view of Matrimandir
