= Visa policy of Sudan =

Policy on permits required to enter Sudan

Visitors to Sudan must obtain a visa from one of the Sudanese diplomatic missions unless they are citizens from one of the visa-exempt countries.

All visitors must hold passports valid for at least 6 months from the date of arrival.

== Visa policy map ==
Visa policy of Sudan Sudan Visa not required (indefinite period) Visa not required (30 days) Visa on arrival Visa required Admission restricted Admission refused

== Visa exemption ==
=== Ordinary passports ===
Citizens of the following countries may enter Sudan without a visa for the following period:

Indefinite period

- Egypt^{1}
- Kuwait
- United Arab Emirates

30 days

- Yemen^{2}

_{1 — Except 18-49 year old males}
_{2 — Must arrive directly from visitor's country of citizenship}

Citizens of Saudi Arabia do not require a visa for business visits, provided they present a letter issued by the Ministry of Investment of Sudan confirming their business visit.

=== Non-ordinary passports ===
Holders of diplomatic or official/service/special passports of the following countries may enter Sudan without a visa:

- Algeria
- China
- Brazil
- Congo
- Ethiopia
- Iran
- Libya
- Namibia
- Russia^{D}
- Turkey
- Vietnam

_{D - Diplomatic passports only.}

=== Future changes ===
Sudan has signed visa exemption agreements with the following countries, but they have not yet been ratified:

Country	Passports	Agreement signed on
Pakistan	Diplomatic, official	7 November 2026
Saint Kitts and Nevis	All	24 February 2022

== Visa on arrival ==
=== Ordinary passports ===
Citizens of the following countries may obtain a visa on arrival:

Indefinite period

- Kenya

60 days

- China
- Eritrea^{1}
- Malaysia
- Qatar
- Turkey^{1}

_{1 — Must arrive directly from visitor's country of citizenship}

=== Non-ordinary passports ===
Holders of diplomatic or special passports of the following countries may obtain a visa on arrival which is valid for maximum of 2 months:

- Benin
- Burkina Faso
- Central African Republic
- Comoros
- Cote d'Ivoire
- Djibouti
- Eritrea
- Gambia
- Ghana
- Guinea
- Guinea-Bissau
- Liberia
- Mali
- Mauritania
- Morocco
- Niger
- Nigeria
- São Tomé and Príncipe
- Senegal
- Sierra Leone
- Somalia
- Togo
- Tunisia

In addition, persons who present proof of a Sudanese father may obtain a visa on arrival, regardless of their current nationality. Persons married to a Sudanese national (both male and female) can also obtain a visa on arrival if they present a valid marriage certificate.

== Police Registration ==
Mandatory Police Registration for all nationalities is required within 24 hours of arrival.

== Admission restrictions ==
=== Bangladesh ===
Citizens of Bangladesh who have United Nations travel documents must have an approval letter issued by the Ministry of Foreign Affairs of Sudan.

=== Israel ===
Citizens of Israel (including dual citizens traveling on another country's passport) are banned from entering and transiting in Sudan.

== See also ==
- Visa requirements for Sudanese citizens
