= Kireet Joshi =

Indian philosopher (1931-2014)

- Born: 10 August 1931; India
- Died: 14 September 2014 (aged 83)
- Education: Bombay University
- Occupations: As an Educational adviser of Gujarat Chief Minister, 2008-2010 and several other important posts
- Known for: Yoga, philosophy, education, teacher training
- Notable credit(s): Author of Several Books on Philosophy, Yoga, Education and Teacher Training
- Website: www.kireetjoshiarchives.com

Kireet Joshi was an Indian philosopher, and disciple of Sri Aurobindo and Mirra Alfassa. In 1976, the Prime Minister of India, Indira Gandhi, appointed Kireet as Education Advisor to the Government of India. He also served as the Chairman of the Indian Council of Philosophical Research.

== Biography ==
Joshi was born on 10 August 1931. He studied philosophy and law at the Bombay University. He was selected for I.A.S. in 1955 but in 1956 he resigned from the post of Assistant Collector of Surat in order to devote himself at Pondicherry (now Puducherry) to the study and practice of the Integral Yoga of Sri Aurobindo and the Mother. He taught Philosophy and Psychology at the Sri Aurobindo International Centre of Education at Pondicherry and participated in numerous educational experiments under the direct guidance of the Mother. In 1976, Government of India invited him to be Educational Advisor in the Ministry of Education. In 1983, he was appointed Special Secretary to the Government of India, and held this post until 1988. He was Member-Secretary of Indian Council of Philosophical Research from 1981 to 1990. He was also Member-Secretary of Rashtriya Veda Vidya Pratishthan from 1987 to 1993. He was the Vice-Chairman of the UNESCO Institute of Education, Hamburg, from 1987 to 1989. From 1999 to 2004, he was the Chairman of Auroville Foundation. As an adviser of Gujarat Chief Minister, he also helped in establishing Children's University and Institute of Teachers Education in state of Gujarat. From 2000 to 2006, he was Chairman of Indian Council of Philosophical Research. From 2006 to 2008, he was Editorial Fellow of the Project of History of Indian Science, Philosophy and Culture (PHISPC). He died on 14 September 2014 in Puducherry.

== Bibliography ==
=== Synthesis of yoga and allied themes ===
- Sri Aurobindo and The Mother ISBN 81-208-0655-7

=== Books on philosophy ===
- A Philosophy of The Role of The Contemporary Teacher
- A Philosophy of Education for The Contemporary Youth
- A Philosophy of Evolution for The Contemporary Man
- Philosophy and Yoga of Sri Aurobindo and Other Essays
- Philosophy of Value-Oriented Education (Theory and Practice)
- Philosophy of Supermind and Contemporary Crisis
- On Materialism
- Towards Universal Fraternity
- Towards A New Social Order

=== Indian culture ===
- The Veda and Indian Culture

=== Education ===
- Education at Crossroads

=== Teaching learning material for teacher training ===
- The Aim of Life
- The Good Teacher and the Good Pupil
- Mystery and Excellence of the Human Body

=== Monographs related to the theme of illumination, heroism, and harmony ===
• Parvati's Tapasya • Nachiketas

=== Speeches, lectures and videos ===
- A New Synthesis of Yoga as a necessity to overcome the impasse of modernity - Skype
