= Sudanese passport =

Passport of the Republic of the Sudan issued to Sudanese citizens

Sudanese passport جواز السفر السوداني (Arabic)
- The front cover of a contemporary Sudanese biometric passport
- Type: Passport
- Issued by: Sudan
- Purpose: Identification
- Eligibility: Sudanese citizenship
- Expiration: 10 years after issuance(for adults) 5 years(for minors)
- Cost: As of 2025: 150,000SDG (for adults). 75,000SDG (for minors). 250 USD/230 EUR (when applying in-person at a Sudanese Overseas Mission)

The Sudanese passport is issued to citizens of Sudan for international travel.

The Republic of the Sudan started issuing electronic passports to citizens in May 2009. The new electronic passport will be issued in three categories:

1. The citizen's passport (ordinary passport) will be issued to ordinary citizens and will contain 48 pages. This passport is valid for ten years.
2. Businessmen and women who need to travel often will be issued a commercial passport that will contain 64 pages. This passport is valid for seven years.
3. Smaller passports that contain 32 pages only will be issued to children.

The microprocessor chip will contain the holder's information. The cost of a new passport for adults will be approximately SDG10000 in 2021.

== Sudanese Passport Features ==
Sudanese passports are dark blue in color, with a gilded falcon in the center of the front cover. Below the logo is the word "passport" and جواز سفر (in English: Passport). The Sudanese passport contains 62 pages, and because Arabic is a written language from right to left, the passport opening starts from right to left. As for the new electronic passports, they are of a dark blue color, with the same design as the green passport.

Sudanese passports are issued in both Arabic and English.

== Issuing Authorities ==
Ordinary passports are issued by the Ministry of the Interior (Passports, Immigration and Nationality Administration), or from consulates and Sudanese embassies outside Sudan. As for the new electronic passports, they are what are currently being issued. No information is available yet on the availability of new passports outside Sudan. Types of Sudanese passports are:

- Diplomatic passports,
- Private passports,
- Passports for a mission,
- Ordinary passports,
- Commercial passports.
- Passports for foreign affairs.

== Passport Pages content ==
In the electronic passport, the information of the passport holder appears on the first page of the passport, and the information is in the following order:

- Passport number 1234356
- National number 655
- The place of issuance is redundant
- Issue date 1:00 pm – 1:00 pm
- End date 6-15
- Issuing authority 5
- A photo of the passport holder
- Barcode (serial number + number of issuing authority)
- Title (in Arabic)
- Reading machine symbols

== See also ==
- Visa requirements for Sudanese citizens
