= Sheena Govan =

Sheena Govan (1912–1967) was an informal spiritual teacher, and the daughter of evangelist John George Govan. Later in life she became an early influence on what would become the Findhorn Foundation. Her career demonstrated some of the links between Evangelicalism and early New Age thought.

== Biography ==
She was born in Edinburgh, the youngest of the four children of evangelist John George Govan. Govan's unconventional spirituality was something of a challenge to the Faith Mission founded by her father in 1913.

She met Dorothy Maclean while the two were working as secretaries in New York in the early 1940s, and again later in London. She met Peter Caddy on a train in England in 1947 and they married in 1948. By this time Sheena was living in Lupus Street, Pimlico, London, apparently drawing on a family inheritance, and claiming to receive inner guidance on behalf of those around her.

Says Peter Caddy: “Her flat was like a magnet. Throughout the day people came for help and guidance. Sheena believed that at this time many people were going through an initiatory experience that she called the birth of the Christ within. She was like a midwife helping them to go through that process.” Dorothy Maclean, now also living and working in London, says: “She’d know what stood between you and your divinity, what you put before the divine.” Eileen Caddy, who had met Peter Caddy in 1952 at RAF Habbaniyah, joined them in London in 1953. Soon after, Dorothy Maclean was to join in, thus at one point all the future founders of the Findhorn Foundation were part of Sheena's London group.

Sheena Govan claimed to teach her students to do everything perfectly and with great love, "unto the Lord." She was also, however, known to subject them to arbitrary orders, such as insisting that Maclean clean her rooms for her. Their friend Dorothy Maclean later recalled that Sheena at some point declared that she was no longer her husband's "other half", and that soon Peter would meet his "true partner". After Peter and Eileen Caddy started living together, Sheena then directed Peter Caddy to abandon Eileen and their baby and take a menial hotel job in Ireland, while Govan took personal custody of the baby herself. Peter Caddy later suggested that "she was beginning to become unhinged".

Soon the group disbanded, as Peter and Eileen rebelled against her and came together (they were already living together with Sheena's approval) and had two sons. Sheena left for a remote country cottage near Glenfinnan, and eventually moved to Isle of Mull, near Iona, West Scotland, where others followed her. As she became more directive of the lives of those around her, her informal group, received some coverage in the Scottish newspapers (Daily Record, Sunday Mail, Scottish Daily Express) in 1957, who dubbed it as the 'Nameless Ones', while Sheena was called "the woman Messiah". Though by 1957, things changed irrevocably, and the other members had regrouped at Glasgow by themselves, as Eileen and Caddy, now married, found jobs at Cluny Hill Hotel near Forres (four miles from Findhorn village), Maclean joined them as the hotel's secretary and soon all parted ways with Sheena.

Govan died of a cerebral haemorrhage in 1967, while living in relative poverty in the village of Dalry in Kirkcudbrightshire, estranged from her former associates and having been largely forgotten.
