= David Spangler =

David Spangler may refer to:

- David Spangler (congressman) (1796–1856), American politician from Ohio
- David Spangler (philosopher) (born 1945), American spiritual philosopher
