= Dorothy Maclean =

Canadian writer (1920–2020)

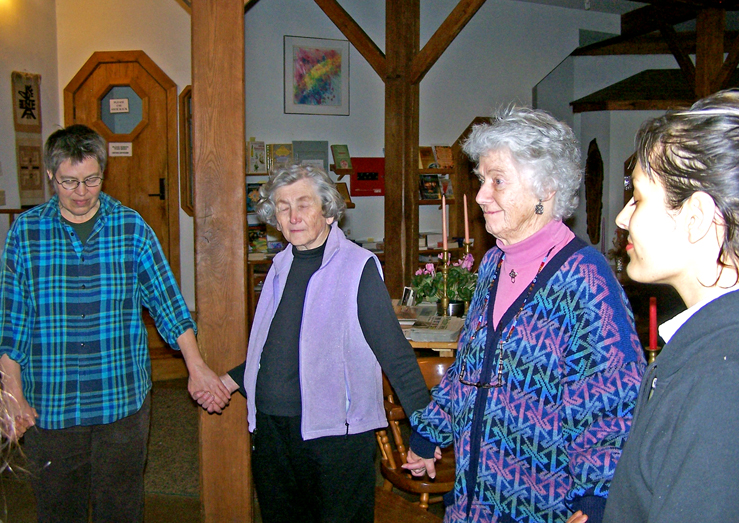
Findhorn co-founder Dorothy Maclean (open eyes) during a weekend workshop given at Sirius Community

Dorothy Maclean (January 7, 1920 – March 12, 2020) was a Canadian writer and educator on spiritual subjects who was one of the original three adults at what is now the Findhorn Foundation in northeast Scotland.

== Biography ==
Maclean was born in Guelph, Ontario. She obtained a 3-year Bachelor of Arts degree from the University of Western Ontario. From 1941 on, she worked for the British Security Coordination in New York City. Following her posting to Panama, she encountered and wedded John Wood, a union that ended in divorce in 1951.

On her way to New York City in 1941, Maclean had met Sheena Govan, and it was through her that she would later meet Peter Caddy. Living in England in the 1950s, Maclean became involved in the spiritual practices of Govan and Caddy, and eventually Eileen Caddy. When the Caddys were appointed to manage a hotel in Scotland, Maclean joined them as the hotel's secretary.

After the Caddys became unemployed in 1962, they moved into a caravan near the village of Findhorn. In 1963, an annex was built so that Maclean could continue to work with them. A community eventually grew up around the Caddys and Maclean, and this community has, since 1972, been known as the Findhorn Foundation.

Maclean was known for her work with devas, said to be intelligences overseeing the natural world. Her book To Hear the Angels Sing gives an overview of this work and also provides autobiographical materials. A full-length biography, Memoirs of an Ordinary Mystic, was published in 2010.

Maclean left Findhorn in 1973 and subsequently founded an educational organization in North America with David Spangler.

Her childhood home, Woodside, at 40 Spring Street, Guelph, has since been designated a heritage property under the Ontario Heritage Act.

Maclean retired from public life in 2010 and lived again at Findhorn. She turned 92 years old during Findhorn Foundation's 50th anniversary celebration in 2012. She turned 100 in January 2020 and died shortly after on March 12, 2020, in Findhorn.

== Selected works ==
- Wisdoms (1971)
- The Living Silence (1977)
- The Soul of Canada (1977)
- To Hear the Angels Sing (1980)
- To Honour the Earth (1991) (with Kathleen Thormod Carr)
- Choice of Love (1998)
- Seeds of Inspiration (2004)
- Call of the Trees (2006)
- Come Closer (2007)
- Memoirs of an Ordinary Mystic (2010)

== Documentary ==
- * Opening To Angels - Guardian Angels and the Angelic Realm (1994)
