= William Irwin Thompson =

American poet and social critic (1938–2020)

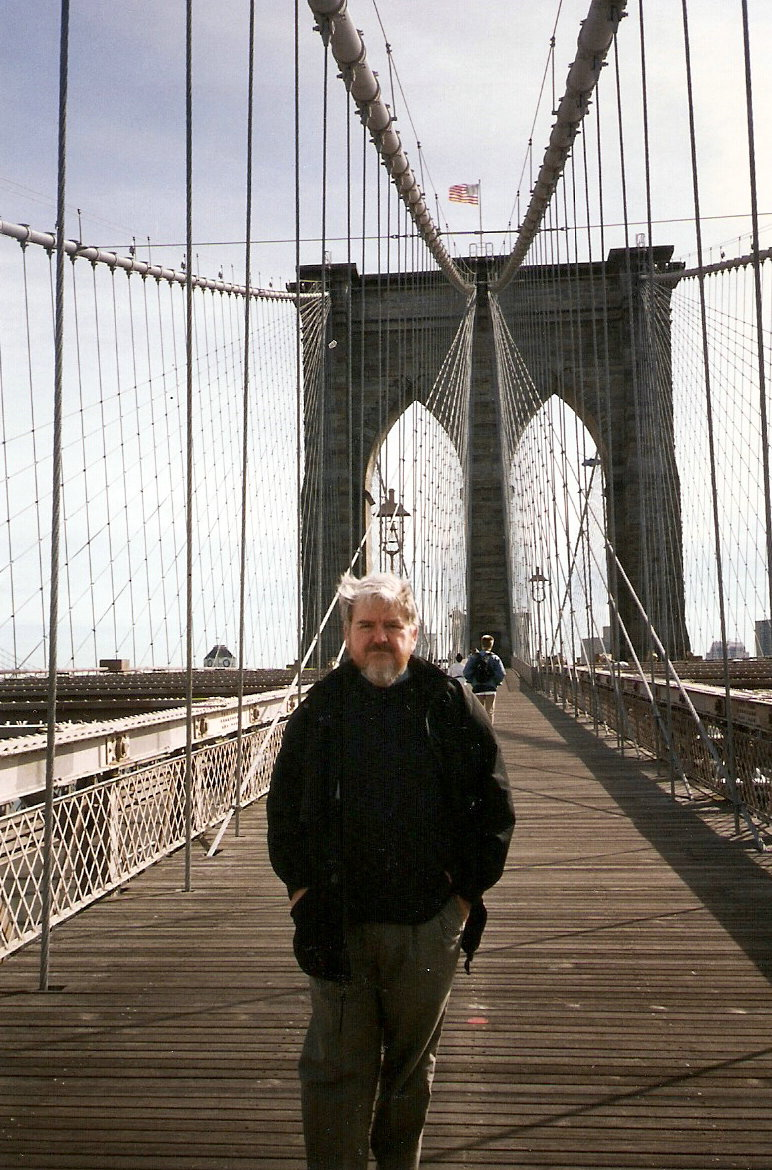
- At the Brooklyn Bridge (1996)
- Born: July 16, 1938; Chicago, Illinois, U.S.
- Died: November 8, 2020 (aged 82); Portland, Maine, U.S.
- Occupation: Social philosopher
- Spouse: Gail Thompson
- Children: 2

William Irwin Thompson (July 16, 1938 – November 8, 2020) was an American social philosopher, cultural critic, and poet. He received the Oslo International Poetry Festival Award in 1986. He described his writing and speaking style as "mind-jazz on ancient texts". He was the founder of the Lindisfarne Association, which proposed the study and realization of a new planetary culture.

== Biography ==
Thompson was born on July 16, 1938 in Chicago, Illinois, and grew up in Los Angeles, California. He graduated from Los Angeles High School in 1957.He received his B.A. at Pomona College in 1962 and his Ph.D. at Cornell University in 1964. He was a professor of humanities at the Massachusetts Institute of Technology and then at York University in Toronto, Ontario. He has held visiting appointments at Syracuse University (in 1973 - where he taught "Resacralization and the Emergence of a Planetary Culture"), the University of Hawaiʻi at Mānoa, the University of Toronto and the California Institute of Integral Studies (1992).

In 1973, he left academia to found the Lindisfarne Association. The Association, which he led from 1972 to 2012, was a group of scientists, poets, and religious scholars who met in order to discuss and to participate in the emerging planetary culture. Thompson lived in Switzerland for 17 years. He describes a recent work, Canticum Turicum in his 2009 book, Still Travels: Three Long Poems, as "a long poem on Western Civilization that begins with folktales and traces of Charlemagne in Zürich and ends with the completion of Western Civilization as expressed in Finnegans Wake and the traces of James Joyce in Zürich."

Thompson was a Founding Mentor to the private K-12 Ross School in East Hampton, New York. In 1995, with mathematician Ralph Abraham, he designed a new type of cultural history curriculum based on their theories about the evolution of consciousness. Thompson lived his retired years in Portland, Maine.

== Work ==
Thompson did his Master's Essay at Cornell on applying the process philosophy of Alfred North Whitehead to poetry; he did his doctoral dissertation on the Easter Rising in Dublin 1916. While serving on the faculty at MIT in the 1960s, Thompson met famed media ecologist Marshall McLuhan, who would influence Thompson's writings on cultural history. Thompson engaged a diverse set of traditions, including the Swiss cultural historian Jean Gebser, the Vedic philosopher Sri Aurobindo Ghose, the autopoetic epistemology of Francisco Varela, the endosymbiotic theory of evolution of Lynn Margulis, the Gaia Theory of James Lovelock, the complex systems thought of Ralph Abraham, the novels of Thomas Pynchon, and the daimonic transmissions of mystic David Spangler.

=== Style ===
Performance is central to Thompson's approach. Performances either open new horizons for the future or close them down, and should be judged on that basis. Thompson thought that with the emergence of the integral era and its electronic media expressions that a new mode of discourse was required. He sought "to turn non-fiction into a work of art on its own terms. Rather than trying to be a scholar or a journalist writing on the political and cultural news of the day, I worked to become a poetic reporter on the evolutionary news of the epoch". He espoused the notion that one must express an integral approach not just in content but in the very means of expressing it. Thompson did this in the way he approached teaching: "The traditional academic lecture also became for me an occasion to transform the genre, to present not an academic reading of a paper, but a form of Bardic performance–not stories of battles but of the new ideas that were emerging around the world...The course was meant to be a performance of the very reality it sought to describe".

"Wissenskunst" (literally, "knowledge-art") is a German term that Thompson coined to describe his own work. Contrasting it with Wissenschaft, the German term for science, Thompson defined Wissenskunst as "the play of knowledge in a world of serious data-processors."

As fiction and music are coming closer to reorganizing knowledge, scholarship is becoming closer to art. Our culture is changing, and so the genres of literature and history are changing as well. In an agricultural-warrior society, the genre is the epic, an Iliad. In an industrial-bourgeois society, the genre is the novel, a Moll Flanders. In our electronic, cybernetic society, the genre is Wissenkunst: the play of knowledge in a world of serious data-processors. The scholarly fictions of Jorge Luis Borges, or the reviews of non-existent books by Stanisław Lem, are examples of new art forms of a society in which humanity live, not innocently in nature nor confidently in cities, but apocalyptically in a civilization cracking up to the universe. At such a moment as this the novelist becomes a prophet, the composer a magician, and the historian a bard, a voice recalling ancient identities.

=== Works ===
==== The Time Falling Bodies Take to Light ====
In his acclaimed 1981 work The Time Falling Bodies Take to Light: Mythology, Sexuality and the Origins of Culture, Thompson criticized what he considers the hubristic pretensions of E. O. Wilson's sociobiology, which attempted to subsume the humanities to evolutionary biology. Thompson then reviewed and critiqued the scholarship on the emergence of civilization from the Paleolithic to the historical period. He analyzed the assumptions and prejudices of the various anthropologists and historians who have written on the subject, and attempted to paint a more balanced picture. He described the task of the historian as closer to that of the artist and poet than to that of the scientist.

Because we have separated humanity from nature, subject from object, values from analysis, knowledge from myth, and universities from the universe, it is enormously difficult for anyone but a poet or a mystic to understand what is going on in the holistic and mythopoeic thought of Ice Age humanity. The very language we use to discuss the past speaks of tools, hunters, and men, when every statue and painting we discover cries out to us that this Ice Age humanity was a culture of art, the love of animals, and women.

Thompson saw the Stone Age religion expressed in the Venus figurines, Lascaux cave paintings, Çatal Hüyük, and other artifacts to be an early form of shamanism. He believed that as humanity spread across the globe and was divided into separate cultures, this universal shamanistic Mother Goddess religion became the various esoteric traditions and religions of the world. Using this model, he analyzed Egyptian mythology, Sumerian hymns, the Epic of Gilgamesh, the cult of Quetzalcoatl, and many other stories, myths, and traditions. Thompson often referred to kriya yoga and yoga nidra throughout these analyses.

==== Coming Into Being ====
In his 1996 work Coming into Being: Artifacts and Texts in the Evolution of Consciousness, Thompson applied an approach that was similar to his 1981 book to many other artifacts, cultures and historical periods. A notable difference, however, is that the 1996 work was influenced by the work of cultural phenomenologist Jean Gebser. Works and authors analyzed include the Enuma Elish, Homer, Hesiod, Sappho, the Book of Judges, the Rig Veda, Ramayana, Upanishads, Bhagavad Gita, and the Tao Te Ching. Thompson analyzed these works using the vocabulary of contemporary cognitive theory and chaos theory, as well as theories of history. An expanded paperback version was released in 1998.

The phrase "Coming into being" is a translation of the Greek term gignesthai, from which the word genesis is derived.

==== Self and Society ====
In his 2004 book Self and Society: Studies in the Evolution of Consciousness, and in collaboration with the mathematician Ralph Abraham, Thompson related Gebser's structures to periods in the development of mathematics (arithmetic, geometric, algebraic, dynamical, chaotic) and in the history of music.

=== Interests ===
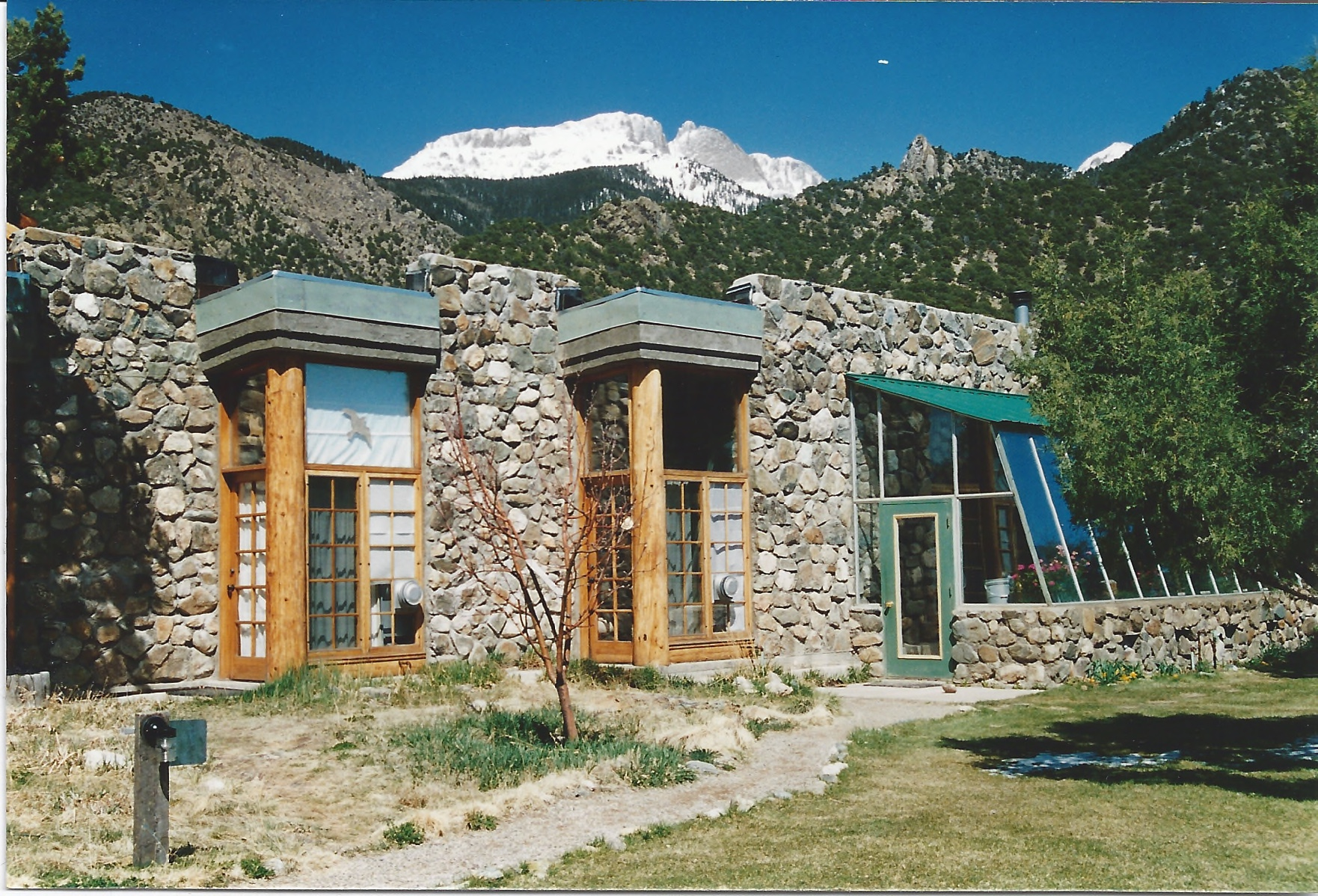
The Lindisfarne Fellows House in Crestone, Colorado

Thompson considered James Joyce's stylistically experimental novel Finnegans Wake to be "the ultimate novel, indeed, the ultimate book," and also to be the climactic artistic work of the modern period and of the rational mentality. He was fascinated by Los Angeles, where he grew up, and Disneyland, which he considered to be Los Angeles' essence. He also wrote a book-length treatment of the Easter Rising of 1916.

Thompson critiqued postmodern literary criticism, artificial intelligence, the technological futurism of Raymond Kurzweil, the contemporary philosophy of mind theories of Daniel Dennett and Paul Churchland, and the astrobiological cosmogony of Zecharia Sitchin.

=== Reception ===
Thompson's second book, At the Edge of History was reviewed in The New York Times by Christopher Lehmann-Haupt in March 1971.

Thompson's 1974 Passages About Earth was reviewed in Time. The reviewer wrote:

From ample but largely gloomy evidence of rapid social change — future shock, ecological disruption, population explosion, proliferation of information — Thompson draws a startling conclusion: "We are the climactic generation of human cultural evolution." Man, he asserts, will now either slide back into a new Dark Age or evolve into a higher, more spiritual being.

Which way will we go? The author opts for evolution. While such optimism is as welcome as it is rare these days, it is largely based on mysticism and intimations of a "new planetary culture," which Thompson shares with Philosopher Teilhard de Chardin and Science-Fiction Writer Arthur C. Clarke. This is thin epistemological ice even for a skater as fast as Thompson. Indeed, incredulous readers may drop the book after the first reference to "our lost cosmological orientation." That would be a mistake. Agree with it or not, Passages is always fascinating, a magical mystery tour of man's potential.

Thompson's 1981 book The Time Falling Bodies Take To Light: Mythology, Sexuality, and the Origins of Culture was reviewed in the New York Times Book Review by Christopher Lehmann-Haupt. Lehmann-Haupt concluded:

In The Time Falling Bodies Take to Light, William Irwin Thompson has gone part of the way toward rescuing mysticism from its Western friends. But only part of the way.

== Selected works ==
Articles

- Thompson, William Irwin (Winter 1964). "The Language of "Finnegans Wake"". The Sewanee Review. 72 (1): 78–90. JSTOR 27540957.
- Thompson, William I. (October 1966). "Collapsed Universe and Structured Poem: An Essay in Whiteheadian Criticism". College English. 28 (1): 25–39. doi:10.2307/374187. JSTOR 374187.
- Thompson, William Irwin (Winter 1983). "The Metaindustrial Village: A possible future encapsulates history...and moves beyond". In Context (1): 44. Archived from the original on November 26, 2005.
- Thompson, William Irwin (Winter 1985–1986). "It's Already Begun: The Planetary Age is an unacknowledged daily reality". In Context (12): 26. Archived from the original on September 25, 2005.
- Thompson, William Irwin (Autumn 1986). "Nine Theses For A Gaia Politique". In Context (14): 58. Archived from the original on September 7, 2005.
- Thompson, William Irwin (2000). "Speculations on the City and the Evolution of Consciousness" (PDF). Journal of Consciousness Studies. 7 (7): 35–42. Archived from the original (PDF) on December 26, 2005.
- Thompson, William Irwin (2002). "The Evolution of the Afterlife" (PDF). Journal of Consciousness Studies. 9 (8): 61–71. Archived from the original (PDF) on November 28, 2005.
- Thompson, William Irwin (2003). "The Borg or Borges?" (PDF). Journal of Consciousness Studies. 10 (4–5): 187–92. Archived from the original (PDF) on December 26, 2005.
- Thompson, William Irwin (2005). "The Case for Teaching Geometry before Algebra" (PDF). Journal of Consciousness Studies. 12 (3): 81–82. Archived from the original (PDF) on September 25, 2006.

Books

- The Imagination of an Insurrection, Dublin, Easter 1916: A Study of an Ideological Movement. Oxford University Press. 1967.
- At the Edge of History: Speculations on the Transformation of Culture. Harper & Row. 1971. ISBN 978-0-686-67570-9.
- Passages about Earth: An Exploration of the New Planetary Culture. Harper & Row. 1974. ISBN 978-0-06-014272-8.
- Evil and World Order. Harper & Row. 1976. ISBN 978-0-06-014276-6.
- Darkness and Scattered Light: Four Talks on the Future. Garden City: Anchor Press. 1978. ISBN 978-0-385-12877-3.
- The Time Falling Bodies Take to Light. New York: St. Martin's Press. 1981. ISBN 978-0-312-80510-4.
- From Nation to Emanation: Planetary Culture and World Governance. Findhorn Publications. 1982. ISBN 978-0-905249-45-2.
- Blue Jade from the Morning Star: An Essay and a Cycle of Poems on Quetzalcoatl. Lindisfarne Press. 1983. ISBN 978-0-940262-03-4.
- Islands Out of Time: A Memoir of the Last Days of Atlantis. Garden City: Dial Press/Doubleday. 1985. ISBN 978-0-385-19571-3.
- Pacific Shift. San Francisco: Sierra Club Books. 1985. ISBN 978-0-87156-750-5.
- Gaia, A Way of Knowing: Political Implications of the New Biology. (Editor). Lindisfarne Press. 1987. ISBN 978-0-89281-080-2.
- Imaginary Landscape: Making Worlds of Myth and Science. St. Martin's Press. 1989. ISBN 978-0-312-02809-1.
- Selected Poems, 1959-1980. Lindisfarne Press. 1989. ISBN 978-0-940262-29-4.
- The American Replacement of Nature: The Everyday Acts and Outrageous Evolution of Economic Life. Doubleday. 1991. ISBN 978-0-385-42025-9.
- Gaia 2: Emergence: The New Science of Becoming. (Editor). Lindisfarne Press. 1991. ISBN 978-0-940262-40-9.
- Spangler, David (1991). Reimagination of the World: A Critique of the New Age, Science, and Popular Culture. (co-author). Bear & Company. ISBN 978-0-939680-92-4.
- Coming into Being: Artifacts and Texts in the Evolution of Consciousness. St. Martin's Press. 1996. ISBN 978-0-312-15834-7.
- Worlds Interpenetrating and Apart: Collected Poems, 1959-1995. SteinerBooks. 1997. ISBN 978-1-58420-201-1.
- Transforming History: A Curriculum for Cultural Evolution. Lindisfarne Press. 2001. ISBN 978-1-58420-001-7.
- Self and Society: Studies in the Evolution of Consciousness. Imprint Academic. 2004. ISBN 978-0-907845-82-9.
- A Diary of Sorts and Streets: Poems. Santa Fe: Onteros Press. 2006. ISBN 978-1-4243-2271-8.
- Still Travels: Three Long Poems. Princeton, NJ: Wild River Books. 2009. ISBN 978-0-557-07882-0.
- Beyond Religion. SteinerBooks. 2013. ISBN 978-1-58420-151-9.
- Nightwatch and Dayshift: Poems 2007-2014. Stockton, NJ: Wild River Books. 2014. ISBN 978-0-9839188-9-9.
- Thinking Together At The Edge Of History: A Memoir of the Lindisfarne Association. Traverse City, MI: Lorian Press. 2016. ISBN 978-0-936878-86-7.
