= Lindisfarne Association =

Former American nonprofit foundation

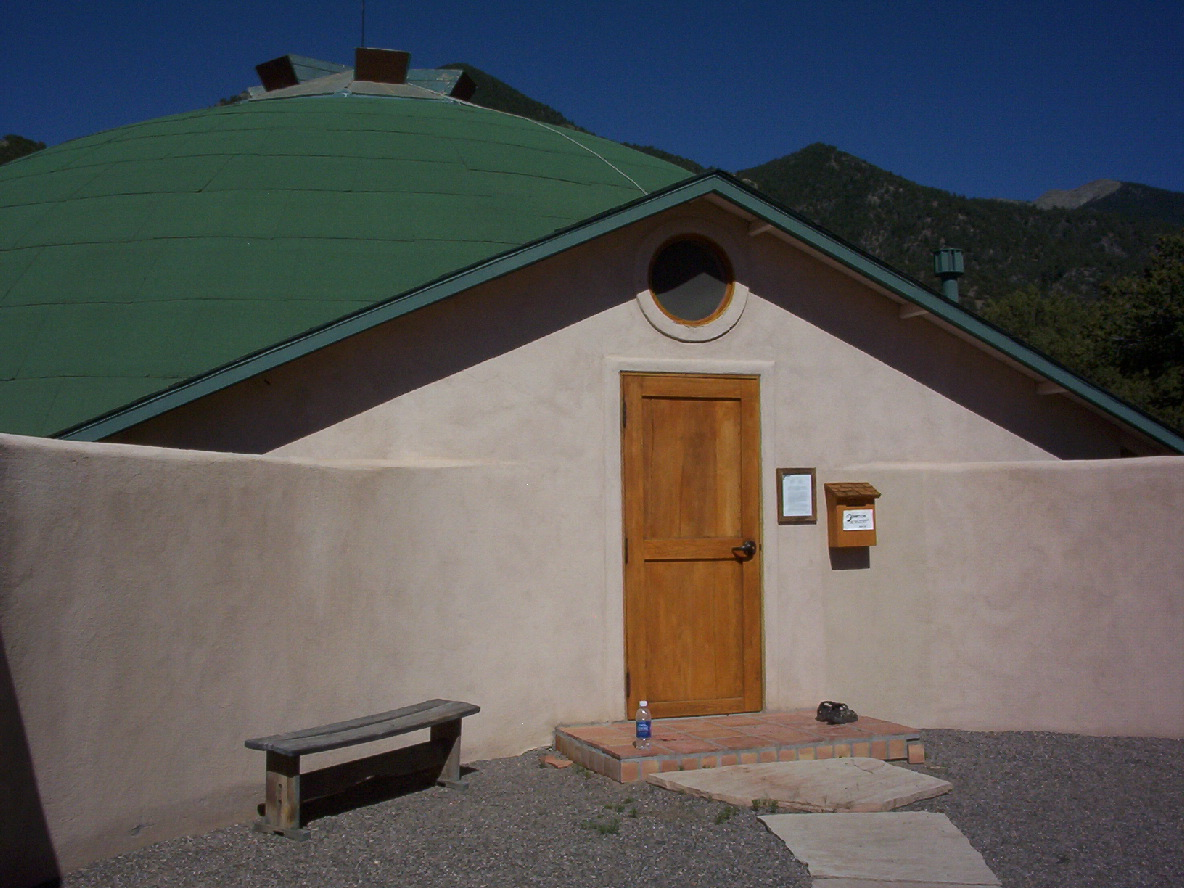
The Lindisfarne chapel in Crestone, Colorado

The Lindisfarne Association (1972–2012) was a nonprofit foundation and diverse group of intellectuals organized by cultural historian William Irwin Thompson for the "study and realization of a new planetary culture".

It was inspired by the philosophy of Alfred North Whitehead's idea of an integral philosophy of organism, and by Teilhard de Chardin's idea of planetization.

== History ==
Thompson conceived the idea for the Lindisfarne association while touring spiritual sites and experimental communities around the world. The Lindisfarne Association is named for Lindisfarne Priory—a monastery, known for the Lindisfarne Gospels, founded on the British island of Lindisfarne in the 7th century.

Advertising executive Gene Fairly had just left his position at Interpublic Group of Companies and begun studying Zen Buddhism when he read a review of Thompson's At the Edge of History in the New York Times. Fairly visited Thompson at York University in Toronto to discuss forming a group for the promotion of planetary culture. Upon returning to New York he raised $150,000 from such donors as Nancy Wilson Ross and Sydney and Jean Lanier. Support from these donors served as an entrée to the Rockefeller Brothers Fund.

=== Incorporation and first years in New York ===
Lindisfarne was incorporated as a non-profit educational foundation in December 1972. It began operations at a refitted summer camp in Southampton, New York on August 31, 1973.

From 1974–1977 Lindisfarne held an annual conference "to explore the new planetary culture" with the following themes:

- Planetary Culture and the New Image of Humanity, 1974
- Conscious Evolution and the Evolution of Consciousness, 1975
- A Light Governance for America: the Cultures and Strategies of Decentralization, 1976
- Mind in Nature, 1977

Earth's answer : explorations of planetary culture at the Lindisfarne conferences (1977) reprints some of the lectures given at the 1974 and 1975 conferences.

The Lindisfarne Association was first based in Southampton, New York in 1973 and then in Manhattan at the Church of the Holy Communion and Buildings which was leased to Lindisfarne from 1976–1979.

=== Move to Crestone and formation of other branches ===
As Lindisfarne began to run low on funding, it faced the loss of its lease on the Church of the Holy Communion. At a conference at the New Alchemy Institute in Cape Cod, Massachusetts, Petro-Canada CEO and United Nations official Maurice Strong offered to donate land from his ranch in Crestone, Colorado. Thompson chose 77 acres of land near Spanish Creek—self-reportedly because his "Irish Druid Radar" had gone off while driving past—where Lindisfarne began to construct new buildings for its purposes.

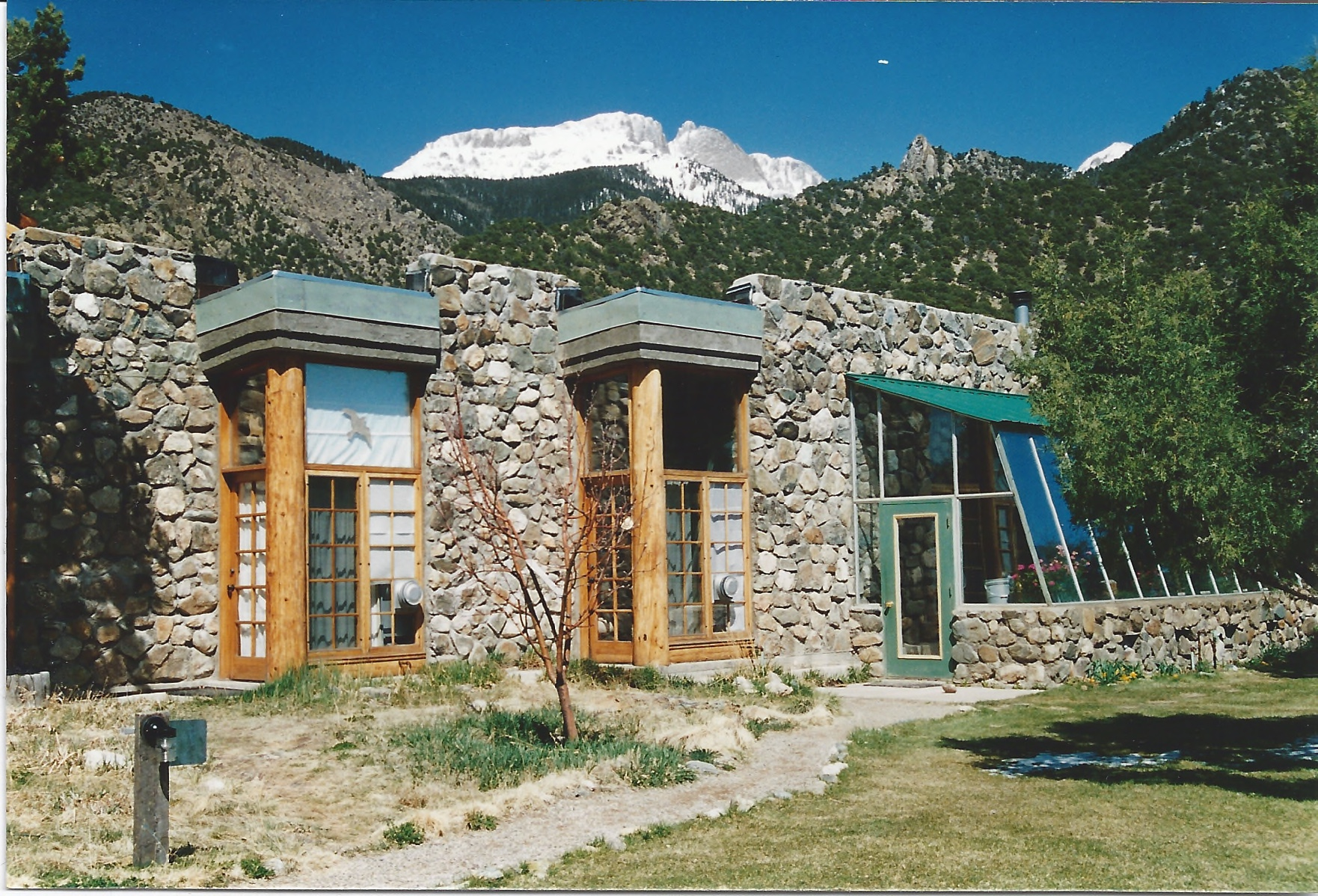
The Lindisfarne Fellows House in Crestone, Colorado

Today the Lindisfarne Fellows House, the Lindisfarne Chapel, and the Lindisfarne Mountain Retreat are under the ownership and management of the Crestone Mountain Zen Center. Lindisfarne has functioned variously as a sponsor of classes, conferences, and concerts and public lectures events, and as a think tank and retreat, similar to the Esalen Institute in California. Lindisfarne functioned as a not-for-profit foundation until 2009; the Lindisfarne Fellowship continued to hold annual meetings until 2012. It is no longer an active organization.

In addition to its facility in Crestone (the "Lindisfarne Mountain Retreat"), three other branches of the organization were formed:

- a headquarters in New York City at the Cathedral of St. John the Divine;
- the Lindisfarne Press was established in Stockbridge, Massachusetts; and
- the Lindisfarne Fellows House was opened at the San Francisco Zen Center.

== Goals and doctrine ==
The Lindisfarne doctrine is closely related to that of its founder, William Thompson. Mentioned as part of the Lindisfarne ideology are a long list of spiritual and esoteric traditions including yoga, Tibetan Buddhism, Chinese traditional medicine, Hermeticism, Celtic animism, Gnosticism, cabala, geomancy, ley lines, Pythagoreanism, and ancient mystery religions.

The group placed a special emphasis on sacred geometry, defined by Thompson as "a vision of divine intelligence, the logos, revealing itself in all forms, from the logarithmic spiral of a seashell to the hexagonal patterns of cooling basalt, from the architecture of the molecule to the galaxy." Rachel Fletcher, Robert Lawlor, and Keith Critchlow lectured at Crestone on the application of sacred geometry, Platonism, and Pythagoreanism to architecture. The exemplar of these ideas is the Grail Chapel in Crestone (also known as Lindisfarne Chapel), which is built to reflect numerous basic geometrical relationships.

Lindisfarne's social agenda was exemplified by the "meta-industrial village", a small community focused on subsistence and crafts while yet connected to a world culture. All members of a community might participate in essential tasks such as the harvest. (Thompson has speculated that in the United States, 40% of the population could work at agriculture, and another 40% in social services.) The villages would have a sense of shared purpose in transforming world culture. They would combine "the four classical economies of human history, hunting and gathering, agriculture, industry, and cybernetics", all "recapitulated within a single deme."

The "Meadowcreek Project" in Arkansas, begun in 1979 by David and Wilson Orr, was an effort to actualize a meta-industrial village as envisioned by the Lindisfarne Association. This project received funding from the Ozarks Regional Commission, the Arkansas Energy Department, and the Winthrop Rockefeller Foundation.

The villages would be linked together by an electronic information network (i.e., what today we call the internet). Thompson called for a counter-cultural vanguard "which can formulate an integral vision of culture and maintain the high standards of that culture without compromise to the forces of electronic vulgarization."

According to the Lindisfarne Association website, Lindisfarne's fourfold goals are:

1. The Planetization of the Esoteric
2. The realization of the inner harmony of all the great universal religions and the spiritual traditions of the tribal peoples of the world.
3. The fostering of a new and healthier balance between nature and culture through the research and development of appropriate technologies, architectural settlements and compassionate economies for meta-industrial villages and convivial cities.
4. The illumination of the spiritual foundations of political governance through scholarship and artistic communications that foster a global ecology of consciousness beyond the present ideological systems of warring industrial nation-states, outraged traditional societies, and ravaged lands and seas.

Thompson has also stated the United States has a unique role to play in the promotion of planetary culture because people from all over the world mingle there. Lindisfarne sought to spread its message widely, through a mailing list and through book publications of the Lindisfarne press.

Journalist Sally Helgesen, after a visit in 1977, criticized Lindisfarne as confused pseudo-intellectuals, citing for example their attempt to build an expensive fish "bioshelter" while overlooking a marsh with fish in it.

== Members ==
Members of the Lindisfarne Fellowship have included, among others:

- mathematician Ralph Abraham
- ecological philosopher David Abram
- economist W. Brian Arthur
- Zen Buddhist Zentatsu Richard Baker
- anthropologist Gregory Bateson
- anthropologist Mary Catherine Bateson
- poet Wendell Berry
- composer Evan Chambers
- geometer and art historian Keith Critchlow
- international law specialist Richard Falk
- physicist David Ritz Finkelstein
- Zen Buddhist Joan Halifax-Roshi
- economist Hazel Henderson
- poet Jane Hirshfield
- Sufi Pir Zia Inayat-Khan
- ecologist Wes Jackson
- biologist Stuart Kauffman
- scientist James Lovelock
- physicist and "soft energy" advocate Amory Lovins
- biologist Lynn Margulis
- dean James Parks Morton
- philosopher/author John Michell
- author Michael Murphy
- dancer/anthropologist Natasha Myers
- religious scholar Elaine Pagels
- poet Kathleen Raine
- writer Dorion Sagan
- economist E. F. Schumacher
- astronaut Rusty Schweickart
- poet Gary Snyder
- architect Paolo Soleri
- spiritual teacher David Spangler
- monk David Steindl-Rast
- United Nations undersecretary Maurice Strong
- philosopher Evan Thompson
- biologist John Todd
- architect Sim Van der Ryn
- philosopher/biologist Francisco Varela
- composer Paul Winter
- physicist/contemplative Arthur Zajonc
- writer Rhoda Lerman

== Current status ==
The Lindisfarne Association disbanded as a not-for-profit institution in 2009. The Lindisfarne Fellows continued to meet once a year up to 2012 at varying locations as an informal group interested in one another's creative projects.
