= Robert Ogilvie Crombie =

Scottish scientist and writer

- Born: 17 May 1899; Edinburgh, Scotland
- Died: 8 March 1975 (aged 75); Edinburgh, Scotland
- Occupations: Scientist, writer

Robert Ogilvie Crombie (17 May 1899 – 8 March 1975), also known as "ROC", was a Scottish supernatural enthusiast and writer. He was born in Edinburgh, Scotland in 1899 and lived there for most of his life.

== Second career ==
Crombie abandoned his career as a scientist due to ill health, and moved from his town house in the city of Edinburgh to the country near Perth, Scotland, to be able to have closer contact with nature.

His account of some of these experiences is published in a chapter of The Findhorn Garden, a book about the early history of the Findhorn Foundation in the north east of Scotland. Crombie's verbal account of his encounters with nature spirits, accompanied by photographic slides of nature was part of the educational programme at Findhorn for many years. He was cited by his friend, the Findhorn co-founder Peter Caddy as a major influence. Crombie died in 1975.

== Writing ==
In addition to his narration for The Findhorn Garden, Crombie also authored the novel The Gentleman and the Faun.

Crombie and his work were mentioned in the film My Dinner with Andre.

== Publications ==
- "ROC": chapter in the book "The Findhorn Garden" (1975)
- "Meeting Fairies: My Remarkable Encounters with Nature Spirits" (2009)
- "The Gentleman and the Faun" (2009)
- "The Occult Diaries of R. Ogilvie Crombie". 2011.
