= Eileen Caddy =

British spiritual teacher and New Age writer

- Born: 26 August 1917; Alexandria, Egypt
- Died: 13 December 2006 (aged 89); Findhorn, Scotland
- Occupations: spiritual teacher, author
- Spouses: Andrew Combe (m. 1939–1953) Peter Caddy (m. 1957–1978)
- Children: Richard, Jenny, Mary-Elizabeth, Suzanne, Penny, Christopher, Jonathan, David
- Parent(s): Albert Jessop, Muriel Jessop

Eileen Caddy MBE (26 August 1917 – 13 December 2006) was a British spiritual teacher and New Age writer, best known as one of the founders of the Findhorn Foundation community at the Findhorn Ecovillage, near the village of Findhorn, Moray Firth, in northeast Scotland. The commune she started in 1962 with husband Peter Caddy and friend Dorothy Maclean was an early New Age intentional community where thousands of people from dozens of countries have resided in years since. One of the UK's largest alternative spiritual communities, The Sunday Times called it, on Caddy's death, "the Vatican of the New Age".

== Early life ==
She was born Eileen Marion Jessop in Alexandria, Egypt, the second of four children of Albert Jessop, an Irishman, and the director of Barclays Bank DCO; her mother Muriel was English. At six she was sent to school in Ireland, where she lodged with an aunt, and returned to Egypt in the holidays. When she was 16, her father died in Egypt of peritonitis and her family moved back to England. Tragedy struck again two years later, when her mother died of meningitis. Thereafter she was educated at a domestic college, and later bought and ran a pub at an RAF base in Oxfordshire, with her brother for four years.

Soon she met an RAF officer, Squadron Leader Andrew Combe, whom she married in 1939, just months before the beginning of the Second World War; subsequently she travelled to London and America with him, and lastly to Iraq, and had a son and four daughters. Combe was a follower of the group called Moral Rearmament (MRA), and insisted that his wife follow the traditions of the group, which included joining the group's "quiet times", during which they would listen for divine guidance. Though diffident at the time towards the practices which she found restrictive, she later acknowledged the importance of her early attunement to "quiet times" and "listening to inner guidance", regarding it as an important milestone on her spiritual journey.

== The beginning of Findhorn ==
In 1952, while posted at RAF Habbaniya, in Iraq, Combe read an article written by Squadron Leader Peter Caddy who was also posted, met him, and became interested in bringing him into the MRA fold; subsequently Eileen was introduced to Peter and his wife, Sheena Govan, daughter of the founders of the Faith Mission. Due to their shared interests in the occult and spirituality, they immediately took a liking to each other. Soon Eileen was in the circle that formed around Sheena Govan.

Peter Caddy's marriage was already in trouble. Their friend Dorothy Maclean later recalled that Sheena had declared that she was no longer her husband's "other half", and that soon Peter would meet his "true partner".

Eileen and Peter fell in love and in 1953 after returning to England, she asked Combe for a divorce in a letter to him in Iraq, where he was still posted. Combe immediately forbade her from seeing their five children. It was then that a traumatized Eileen visited a private sanctuary at Glastonbury with Peter, where she first claimed to have heard while meditating, the "voice of God", which said: "Be still and know that I am God." Initially she took it as a sign of a nervous breakdown, but in time she began to "love the voice as an instrument from the God within us all". Her subsequent instructions from the "voice" directed her to take on Sheena as her spiritual teacher. Sheena moved away to the Isle of Mull, Scotland, having divorced Peter Caddy. By the autumn of 1956, Peter and Eileen came over to join her nascent group of followers there, along with the two children they already had together. Following a divorce, Eileen married Peter Caddy in 1957, and they had one more son in 1968.

Meanwhile, Sheena's group was fast gaining popularity, and was dubbed the 'Nameless Ones' by the local media, which also called her "the woman Messiah". Subsequently, from 1957, Peter and Eileen Caddy co-managed a run-down hotel in Scotland, the Cluny Hill Hotel in Forres, Moray, which they reportedly resurrected and turned into a four star hotel following practical guidance given by the "voice". Early in 1962, the couple along with most of the staff were sent by the management to resurrect another of their properties, the Trossachs Hotel, at Perthshire, but when they pleaded to be shifted back to Forres closer to their "mission", they were fired.

Following the resulting period of unemployment, on 17 November 1962 Eileen, her husband Peter, the children and their colleague Dorothy Maclean, moved to a holiday caravan in a trailer park, a few miles from Forres and a mile from the village of Findhorn. There they began practising organic gardening as a means of supplementing their family's food supply. The garden flourished to such a remarkable extent with the help of what they claimed were plant spirit and devas that it eventually attracted national attention, and was featured in a 1965 BBC radio programme. Its supporters included Sir George Trevelyan and Lady Eve Balfour of the Soil Association.

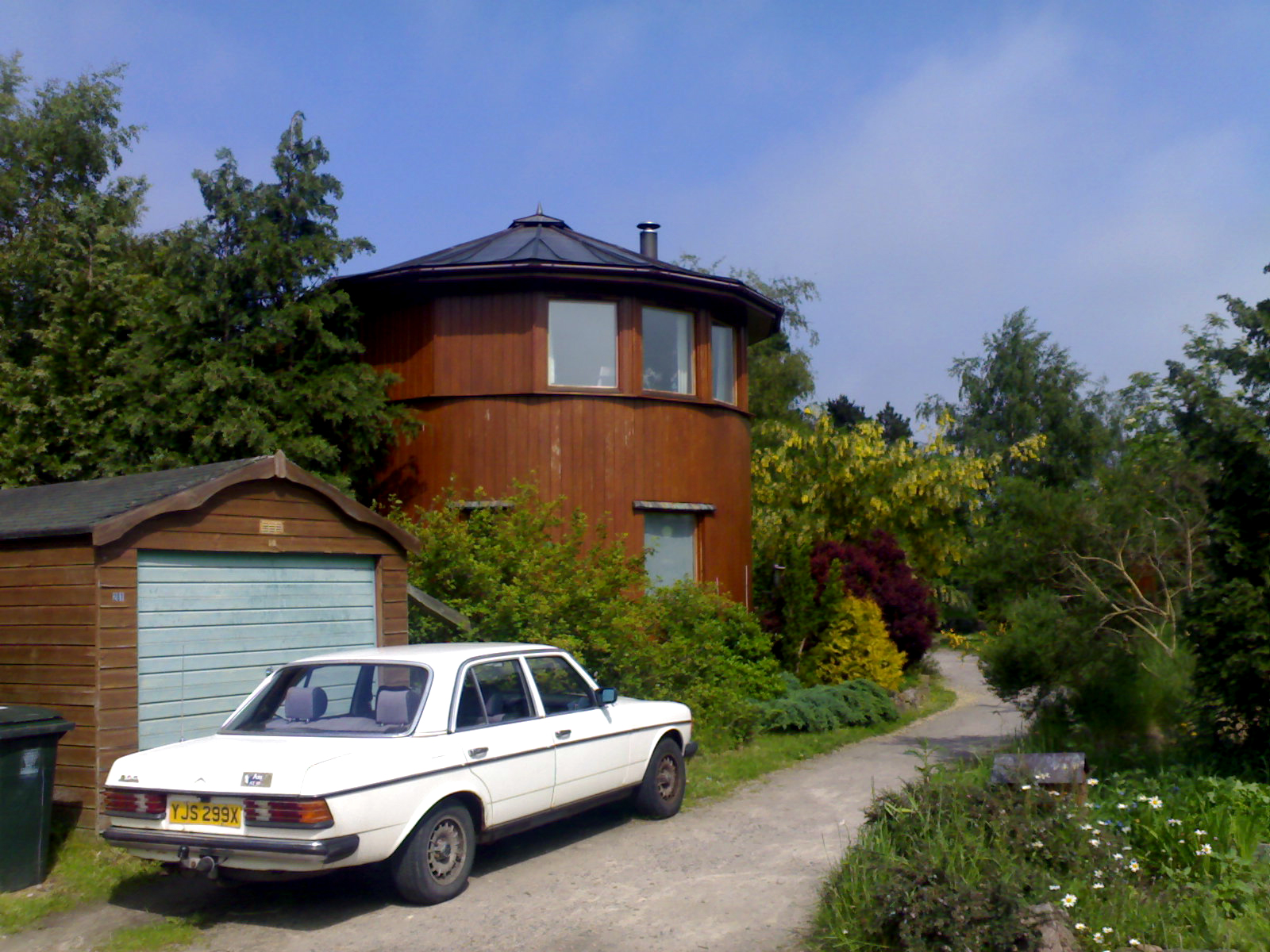
Recycled living in the Findhorn Foundation Community made from the old vats used in whisky stills.

Beginning in 1965 a community, eventually known as the Findhorn Foundation, began to form around the work and spiritual practices of Eileen and Peter Caddy and Dorothy Maclean. The community was featured in several television documentaries by the BBC, starting in 1969, when BBC TV programme Man Alive came to Findhorn, resulting in greatly increased public awareness. Soon the place became a favorite haunt for thousands of New Agers from around the world and the community bought the Cluny Hill Hotel in 1975 and turned it into a college, which stands seven miles from the Findhorn Bay Area caravan park, which was bought in 1983 More recently it was profiled by the Channel 4 documentary series, The Haven, in 2004.

In 1971 Eileen, as "guided" by her inner voice, stopped receiving guidance for the community and from then on remained as an inspiring figure within the community. Dorothy Maclean moved to the United States in 1973, while Peter left Findhorn in 1978 after falling for a young female community member; he married twice in the following years, even started a Findhorn-style community in California, but eventually died in a car crash in 1994. Meanwhile, all through the 1980s, Eileen travelled across the world speaking at spiritual gathers, and also writing several books, including her "compendium of daily guidance", "Opening Doors Within", which went on to be translated in 30 languages. Her works include God Spoke to Me, a volume of inspirational messages published in various formats from 1966 onwards, and an autobiography titled Flight into Freedom and Beyond. Finally in 1996 at the age of 76, Eileen stopped giving workshops, as her inner voice "suggested".

== Later years ==
In the late 1960s Eileen had been reconciled with her first family, and in 1997 all her eight children came together for the first time to celebrate her 80th birthday. In 2001 she was named one of the 50 most spiritually influential people in Britain on Channel 4's "The God List". For services to spiritual inquiry, Eileen Caddy was in 2004 awarded the MBE by Queen Elizabeth II of the United Kingdom. The award was presented by the Lord Lieutenant of Moray, Air Vice-Marshal George Chesworth.

Eileen Caddy died on 13 December 2006 at Findhorn, after leaving instructions that her death "be a cause for thanksgiving, rather than mourning." Today, the original Caddy caravan of the 1960s houses the Findhorn Foundation's Spiritual and Personal Development department, amidst trees and flowers within the Findhorn Ecovillage.

== Bibliography ==
- God Spoke to Me (originally published in serial format beginning in 1966), Findhorn Press, 1992. ISBN 0-905249-81-X.
- The Findhorn garden (1975, contributor)
- Footprints on the Path (1976). Findhorn Press. ISBN 0-905249-80-1
- The Spirit of Findhorn (1976). Findhorn Press, 1994. ISBN 0-905249-97-6.
- Living word (1977). Findhorn. ISBN 0-905249-69-0.
- Foundations of Findhorn (1978). Findhorn. ISBN 0-905249-29-1
- The Dawn of Change (1979). Findhorn Press. ISBN 0-905249-87-9.
- Opening Doors Within (1986, with Mike Scott). Findhorn Press. ISBN 1-84409-108-2.
- Flight into freedom (1988, with Liza Hollingshead), Published by Element. ISBN 1-85230-021-3.
- Foundations of a Spiritual Community (1991). Findhorn Press. ISBN 0-905249-78-X.
- Bringing More Love into your Life (1992, with David Earl Platts). Findhorn Press, 1992. ISBN 0-905249-75-5.
- Choosing to Love: A Practical Guide for Bringing More Love into Your Life, (David Earl Platts). Findhorn Press, 1993. ISBN 0-905249-90-9.
- Waves of spirit (1996). Findhorn. ISBN 1-899171-75-4.
- Divinely Ordinary, Divinely Human: Celebrating the Life and Work of Eileen Caddy, by David Earl Platts. Findhorn Press, 1999. ISBN 1-899171-87-8.
- Flight into freedom and beyond (2002, with Liza Hollingshead). Findhorn. ISBN 1-899171-64-9.
- The Findhorn book of Learning to Love (2004, with David Earl Platts). Findhorn Press. ISBN 1-84409-033-7.
- Small voice within (2005, audio CD re-issue of cassette tapes from c. 1981)
- Opening doors within (2005, DVD, with Mike Scott)
