= David Spangler (philosopher) =

American spiritual philosopher

David Spangler (born January 7, 1945) is an American spiritual philosopher and self-described "practical mystic". He helped transform the Findhorn Foundation in northern Scotland into a center of residential spiritual education and was a friend of William Irwin Thompson. Spangler is considered one of the founding figures of the modern New Age movement, although he is highly critical of what much of the movement has since become, especially its commercial and sensationalist elements.

== Childhood and education ==
Spangler was born in Columbus, Ohio in 1945. At the age of six, he moved to Morocco in North Africa where his father was assigned as a counterintelligence agent for U.S. Army Intelligence. He lived there for six years, returning to the United States when he was twelve in 1957. He attended Deerfield Academy in Massachusetts, which was considered a Protestant school. His time at Deerfield was interrupted when his family moved to Phoenix, Arizona, where he graduated from high school. He attended Arizona State University where he was working for a Bachelor of Science degree in biochemistry but continued to pursue other subjects of interest.

== The Findhorn Foundation ==
In 1970, Spangler went to Britain where he visited the spiritual community of Findhorn in northern Scotland. He claimed to have been told by non-physical, spiritual contacts that he would find his "next cycle of work" in Europe; he arrived at Findhorn and was told that one of the founders, Eileen Caddy, had had a vision three years earlier that a David Spangler would be coming there to live and work in the community. Not knowing who David Spangler was, but having read a small booklet written by him which someone sent to them, Eileen and her husband Peter Caddy and their Canadian colleague, Dorothy Maclean, the three founders of the Findhorn Community, had been waiting for someone with that name to arrive. Sometime after Spangler's arrival, he was offered and accepted joint directorship of the community along with Peter Caddy. He remained in the Findhorn Community until 1973. He then returned to the United States with a number of other Americans and Europeans, including Dorothy Maclean, where they founded the Lorian Association as a non-profit vehicle for the spiritual and educational work they wished to do together.

== Going beyond the "New Age" ==
Over the years since then, Spangler has continued to lecture and teach and has written numerous books on spirituality. He is considered one of the founding figures of the modern New Age phenomenon, but early on he identified its shadow and rejected what he termed "its further outgrowth into a myriad of 'old age' pursuits (including spiritual pursuits) dressed in 'new age' garb". This devolution into commercially-driven fads, identity politics, mystical glamour, atavistic spiritualisms, and uncritical guru reverence was a main theme of his Reimagination of the World, co-authored with fellow-traveler and cultural historian William Irwin Thompson.

Spangler has often been miscast as a new-age channeler due in part to the "transmissions" received while living at the intentional community at Findhorn, Scotland in the 1970s, which became the core of his first book Revelation: The Birth of a New Age. In hindsight it can be seen that Spangler's ideas were at that time transitional between the earlier theosophical esotericism represented by Alice Bailey and an emerging worldview that is more postmodern, less obscure, and less metaphysical than theosophy. Spangler himself reports that it took him some years to develop a language in which to communicate clearly the insights and experiences he had been having since childhood.

== Recent activities ==
In recent years he has emphasized a practical or incarnational spirituality in which our everyday lives—our physical, embodied, sometimes resplendent and sometimes shabby persons—can be experienced as spiritual or sacred, as opposed to a spirituality concerned solely with the transpersonal and transcendent. Spangler defines Incarnational Spirituality most simply as the exploration and celebration of the individual and his or her unique spiritual and creative capacities. The practice of Incarnational Spirituality is one of honoring the sacredness and sovereignty of each of us and practicing our powers of blessing, manifestation, collaboration, and loving engagement with life. It is not a religious practice, but an understanding of how we connect to this world and how we may grow and develop and shape ourselves and our world by our intention, presence, participation and service.

In 2010 his memoir Apprenticed to Spirit was published by Riverhead Books, describing his early years, his spiritual training, his association with Findhorn, Lindisfarne, and the New Age Movement, and his subsequent work with the Lorian Association and the development of Incarnational Spirituality.

Spangler is currently the Director of the Lorian Center for Incarnational Spirituality and a Director of the Lorian Association. Through Lorian, he publishes a free monthly essay, David's Desk, and a subscription-only quarterly esoteric journal, Views from the Borderland, offering "field notes" from his clairvoyant researches and encounters with the subtle worlds.

== Partial bibliography ==
- Revelation: Birth of a New Age, by David Spangler, Findhorn Press, 1971
- The Little Church, by David Spangler, Findhorn Press, 1972
- The Laws of Manifestation, Findhorn Press, 1975
- Towards a Planetary Vision, by David Spangler, Findhorn Press, 1976
- Relationship and Identity, by David Spangler, Findhorn Press, 1977
- Reflections on the Christ, Findhorn Press, 1978
- Emergence: The Rebirth of the Sacred, by David Spangler, Doubleday, 1986
- Reimagination of the World: A Critique of the New Age, Science, and Popular Culture, by David Spangler (with William Irwin Thompson), Bear and Co., 1991
- Everyday Miracles, by David Spangler, Bantam, 1996
- The Call, by David Spangler, Riverhead Books, 1996
- A Pilgrim in Aquarius, by David Spangler, Findhorn Press, 1996
- Parent as Mystic, Mystic as Parent, by David Spangler, Riverhead Books, 1998
- Blessing: The Art and the Practice, by David Spangler, Riverhead Books, 2001
- The Story Tree, by David Spangler, Lorian Press, 2004
- The Manifestation Kit, Lorian Press, 2005
- The Incarnational Card Deck, by David Spangler, Lorian Press, 2008
- The Laws of Manifestation (revised), by David Spangler, RedWheel/Weiser Books, 2009
- Incarnational Spirituality, by David Spangler, Lorian Press, 2009
- The Flame of Incarnation, by David Spangler, Lorian Press, 2009
- Subtle Worlds, by David Spangler, Lorian Press, 2010
- Facing the Future, by David Spangler, Lorian Press, 2010
- An Introduction to Incarnational Spirituality, by David Spangler, Lorian Press, 2011
- A Midsummer's Journey, by David Spangler, Lorian Press, 2011
- The Call of the World, by David Spangler, Lorian Press, 2011
- The Soul's Oracle Card Deck, by David Spangler, Lorian Press, 2011
- The Card Deck of the Sidhe, by David Spangler, Lorian Press, 2011
- Apprenticed to Spirit, by David Spangler, Riverhead Books, 2011
- Numerous articles in various magazines, including New Age Journal, East-West Journal, The Sun, New Times.
- Lorian Textbooks: Slightly edited transcripts of online classes:
  - World Work, by David Spangler, Lorian Press, 2008
  - Crafting Home: Generating the Sacred, by David Spangler, Lorian Press, 2009
  - Crafting Relationships:The Holding of Others, by David Spangler, Lorian Press, 2009
  - Partnering With Earth, by David Spangler, Lorian Press, 2013
  - Starheart and Other Stores, by David Spangler, Lorian Press, 2013
  - Conversations with the Sidhe, by David Spangler, Lorian Press, 2014
  - Journey into Fire, by David Spangler, Lorian Press, 2015
