= Jean Gebser =

Swiss philosopher, linguist, and poet (1905–1973)

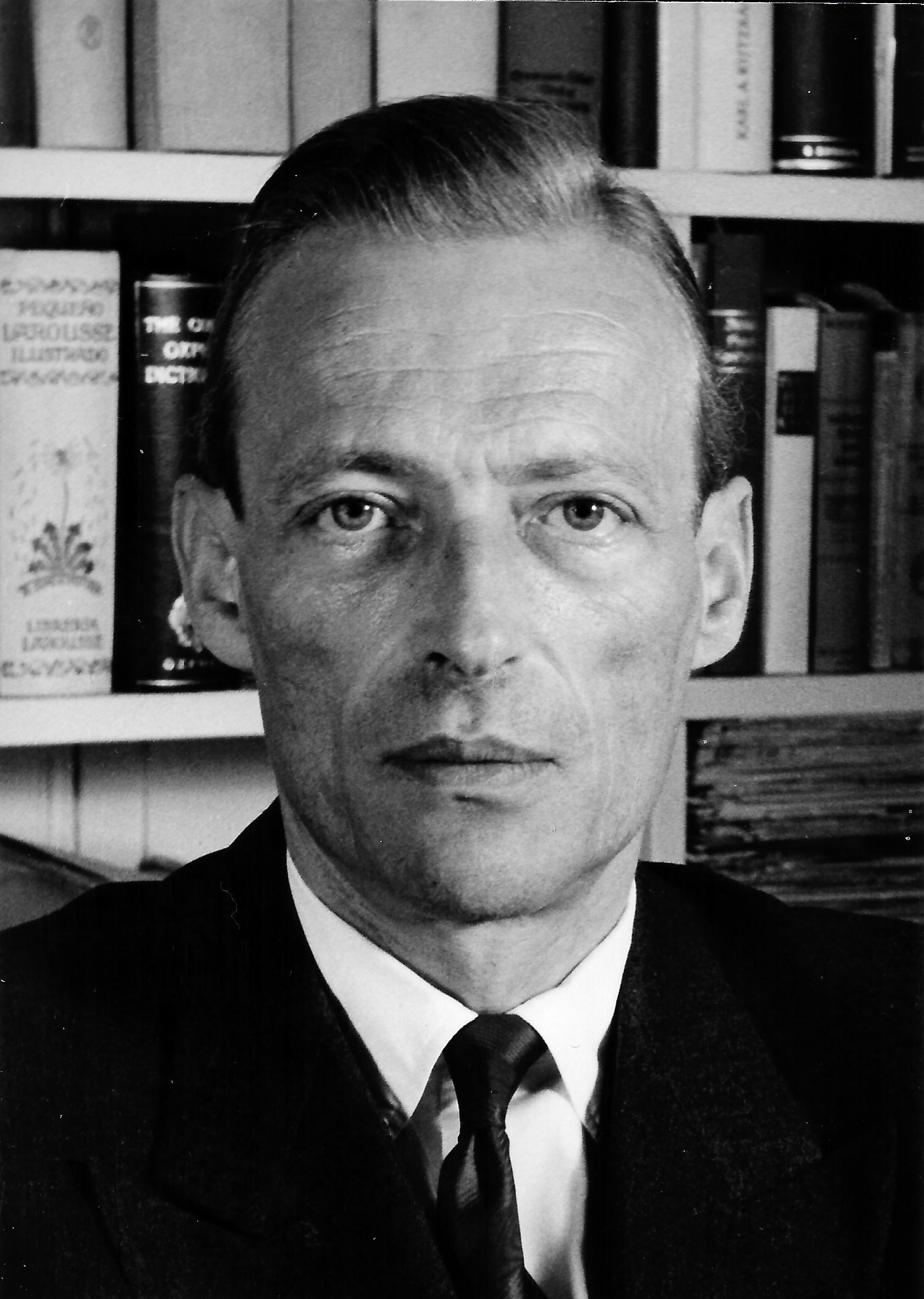
- Jean Gebser (1957)
- Born: Hans Karl Hermann Rudolph Gebser; 20 August 1905; Posen, German Empire
- Died: 14 May 1973 (aged 67); Wabern bei Bern, Switzerland

Education
- Education: Friedrich Wilhelm University (attended)

Philosophical work
- Era: 20th-century philosophy
- Region: Western philosophy
- School: Continental philosophy Phenomenology
- Institutions: Institute for Applied Psychology, Zurich
- Main interests: Phenomenology of consciousness
- Notable ideas: Consciousness in transition

Jean Gebser (born Hans Karl Hermann Rudolph Gebser, German: [ˈɡeːpsɐ]; August 20, 1905 – May 14, 1973) was a Swiss philosopher, linguist, and poet who described the structures of human consciousness.

== Biography ==
Gebser was born in Posen in Imperial Germany (later Poland). His father was lawyer Frederich Gebser and mother was Margaretha Grundmann. He was a cousin of World War I-era chancellor Theobald von Bethmann Hollweg.

He left Germany in 1929, living for a time in Italy and then in France. He then moved to Spain, mastered the Spanish language in a few months and entered the Spanish Civil Service where he rose to become a senior official in the Ministry of Education.

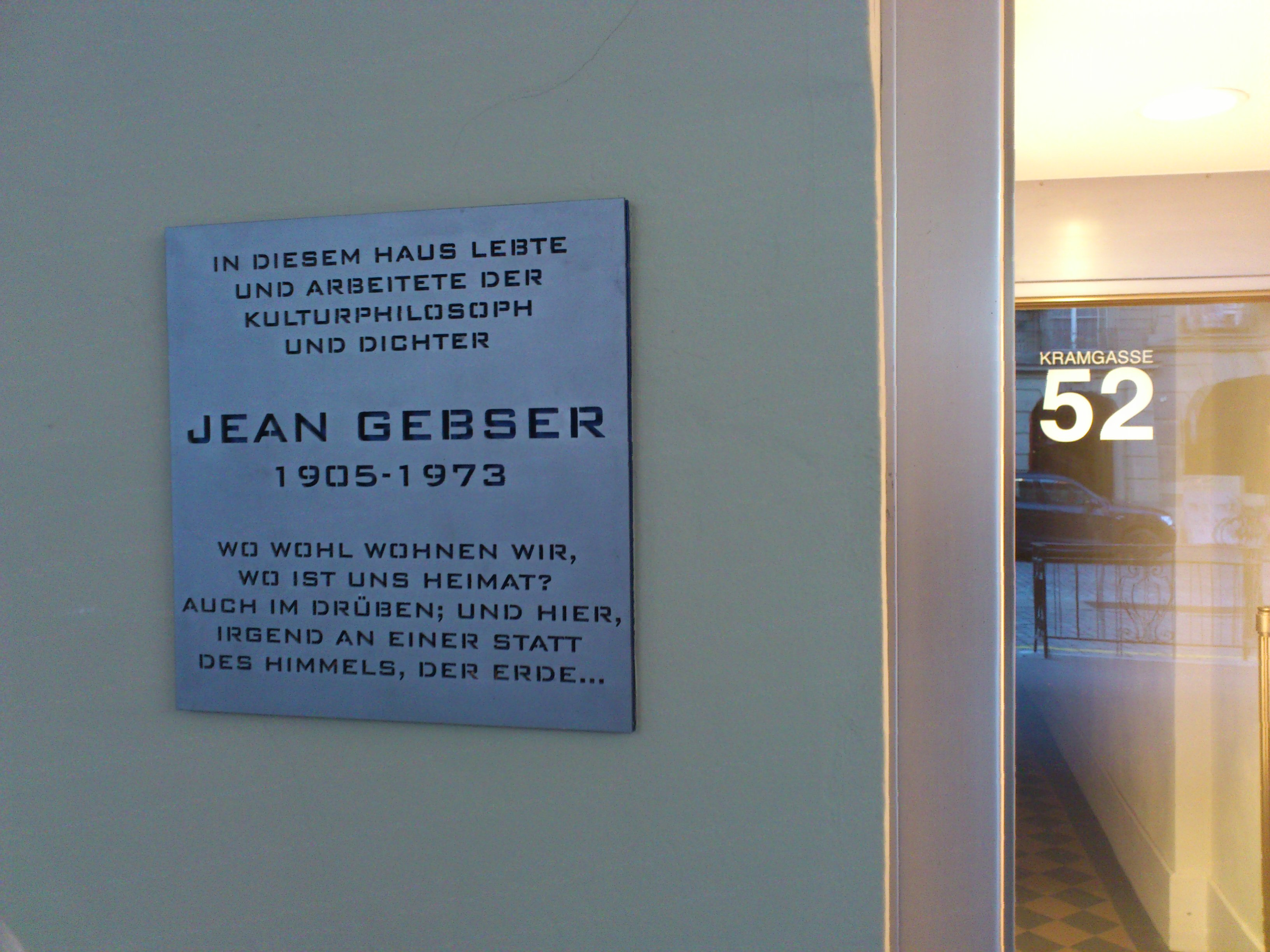
Commemorative plaque at the Kramgasse 52 in Bern (Switzerland)

Before the Spanish Civil War began, he moved to Paris, and then to Southern France. It was here that he changed his German first name "Hans" to the French "Jean." (Note: Gebser Biography) (Note: The Primordial Leap and the Present: The Ever-Present Origin – An Overview of the Work of Jean Gebser) He lived in Paris for a while but saw the unavoidability of a German invasion. He fled to Switzerland in 1939, escaping only hours before the border was closed. He spent the rest of his life near Bern, where he did most of his writing. Even late in life, Gebser travelled widely in India, the Far East, and the Americas, and wrote half a dozen more books. He was also a published poet.

Gebser died in Wabern bei Bern on May 14, 1973 "with a soft and knowing smile." (Note: Gebser had written in Die Schlafenden Jahre, "When we are born we cry and weep, when we die we should smile." Algis Mickunas, professor emeritus of philosophy at Ohio University was given a tape of Gebser's last death-bed utterances by Gebser's widow and this tape has been digitally enhanced by the media laboratory at the University of Oklahoma (his weakened state and his asthma made him difficult to understand).) His personal letters and publications are held at the Gebser Archives at the University of Oklahoma History of Science Collections, Norman, Oklahoma, Bizzel Libraries.

== Consciousness in transition ==
Gebser's major thesis was that human consciousness is in transition, and that these transitions are "mutations" and not continuous. These jumps or transformations involve structural changes in both mind and body. Gebser held that previous consciousness structures continue to operate parallel to the emergent structure.

Consciousness is "presence", or "being present":

As Gebser understands the term, "conscious is neither knowledge nor conscience but must be understood for the time being in the broadest sense as wakeful presence." (Note: This resembles Heidegger's Dasein, being there, being consciousness. Consciousness is not just a mirror, but an active presence. Compare also the German word for consciousness, bewusstsein, which means literally "consciousness-being". It also resembles Asian religious philosophical terms and views, such as Rigpa in Dzogchen, and Ramana Maharshi's view on awareness as the sole reality underlying the ego-structure or "I-thought.")

Each consciousness structure eventually becomes deficient, and is replaced by a following structure. The stress and chaos in Europe from 1914 to 1945 were the symptoms of a structure of consciousness that was at the end of its effectiveness, and which heralded the birth of a new form of consciousness. The first evidence he witnessed was in the novel use of language and literature. He modified this position in 1943 so as to include the changes which were occurring in the arts and sciences at that time.

His thesis of the failure of one structure of consciousness alongside the emergence of a new one led him to inquire as to whether such had not occurred before. His work, Ursprung und Gegenwart is the result of that inquiry. It was published in various editions from 1949 to 1953, and translated into English as The Ever-Present Origin. Working from the historical evidence of almost every major field, (e.g., poetry, music, visual arts, architecture, philosophy, religion, physics and the other natural sciences, etc.) Gebser saw traces of the emergence (which he called "efficiency") and collapse ("deficiency") of various structures of consciousness throughout history.

== Structures of consciousness ==
Gebser distinguished the following structures:

1. The archaic structure
2. The magic structure
3. The mythical structure
4. The mental structure
5. The integral structure

=== Archaic structure ===
The archaic structure is the first structure of consciousness to emerge from the "ever-present origin":

The term "archaic" as used here is derived from the Greek arce, meaning inception, or origin. Origin (or Ursprung, in the original German) is the source from which all springs, but it is that which springs forth itself. It is the essence which is behind and which underlies consciousness.

No direct information on this structure is available; it is inferred from writings from later times. It is zero-dimensional; consciousness is only "a dimly lit mist devoid of shadows". It is not individual, but "was totally identical with the whole":

The human being was totally immersed in the world unable to extricate himself or herself from that world. They were identical with that world.

=== Magic structure ===
In the magical structure events, objects and persons are magically related. Symbols and statues do not just represent those events, objects and persons, but are those same objects and persons. Gebser symbolizes this "one-dimensional" consciousness structure by the space-less, time-less "point". Unlike the archaic structure in which there is a "perfect identity of man and universe", man is aware of nature as something within his community to which it must "listen" and out of which it must act in order to survive.

=== Mythical structure ===
Gebser symbolizes the "two-dimensional" mythical structure by the circle and cyclical time, based on man's discovery of the rhythmic recurrence of natural events and of his inner reflections on his experience of those events. "...[W]hereas the distinguishing characteristic of the magic structure was the emergent awareness of nature, the essential characteristic of the mythical structure is the emergent awareness of soul." In the mythical structure events, objects and persons are woven together in stories. Mythologies give coherence to consciousness. An important element in myth is polarity; the etymology of myth itself implies both speaking (mouth, mythos) and silence (mute, myein). Gebser explains that polarity makes myth particularly foreign to the mental consciousness structure: "Only when we acknowledge both meanings of the root can we discern the fundamental nature of the mythical structure. Only when taken together as an elemental ambivalence, and not a rational contradiction, are they constitutive for the mythical structure." "Only a mental world requires laws; the mythical world, secure in the polarity, neither knows nor needs them."

=== Mental structure ===
The mental structure appropriates events, objects and persons by the use of logic. In its efficient form, the mental structure is "three-dimensional". Gebser symbolizes it with the "triangle", which illustrates a "trinity" of thesis, antithesis, and synthesis: "the base of the triangle with its two points lying in opposition represents the dual contraries or antinomies which are unified at the point or apex." For Gebser, this is the essence of "the emergence of directed or discursive thought" with which Western science would be built. "It required centuries to sufficiently devitalize and demythologize the word so that it was able to express distinct concepts freed from the wealth of imagery, as well as to reach the rationalistic extreme where the word, once a power [magic] and later an image [myth], was degraded to a mere formula."

The deficient form of the mental structure Gebser called the 'rational' structure. The rational structure of awareness seeks to deny the other structures with its claim that humans are exclusively rational.

The rational structure is known for its extremes as evidenced in various "nothing but..." statements. Extreme materialism claims that "everything is nothing but matter — atoms". Philosophy, the love of wisdom, is replaced with instrumental reason, the ability "to make". Contemplation—looking inward—is devalued in relation to what one "can do". "Wise men" fall out of favor and are replaced by the "man of action." Successes in technologically re-shaping matter offer solutions to some problems but also give rise to problems of their own making. Mechanized slaughter of two world wars and the new atomic weapons exemplified and symbolized the expression of the ontology of the rational/mental structure. Living becomes hard to bear in such a consciousness structure.

Some saw the cause of this despair as a lack of values or ethics. Gebser saw that it is the very consciousness structure itself which has played out to its inherent end. He saw that its metaphysical presumptions necessarily led to this ethical dead end. A "value-free" ontology like materialism leads of necessity to living "without value". Any attempt to remedy the situation by a return to "values" would ultimately fail. But it was through this very quagmire of "the decline of the West" that Gebser saw the emergence of a new structure of consciousness which he termed the integral.

=== Integral structure ===
The integral consciousness structure was made evident by a new relationship to space and time. In the second part of his work, Gebser set out to document the evidence that he saw throughout various human endeavors. Of note here were the incorporation of time in physics, the attempts to "paint" time in the visual arts and the like. Gebser noticed that the integral structure of consciousness was largely witnessed as the irruption of time into the "fixed-reality" of the mental structure. For Gebser, dualistically opposed and "static" categories of Being gave way to transparency.

Transparency points to how it is that the one is "given-through" and always "along-with" the other. For centuries, time was viewed as having distinct categories of past, present and future. These categories were said to be wholly distinct one from the other. Of course, this created all kinds of difficulties regarding how beings moved from one category to the other — from present to past, for example. What integral awareness notices is that though we may utilize categorical thinking for various purposes, we also have the realization that time is an indivisible whole. That various beings in the present are crystallized from the past, and which also extend into the future. In fact, without already having an integral awareness, one could have no notion of time as "past" or "present", etc. Without the awareness of the whole, one would be stuck in a kind of "not-knowing" of an always only "now" not connected to any sense of past or future. Even the mental awareness which divides this whole into distinct categories could not have become aware of those categories without an awareness which was already integral. Thus, awareness is already integral.

Gebser introduced the notion of presentiation which means to make something present through transparency. An aspect of integral awareness is the presentation, or "making present", of the various structures of awareness. Rather than allowing only one (rational) structure to be valid, all structures are recognized, presented, one through the other. This awareness of and acceptance of the various structures enables one to live through the various structures rather than to be subjected to them ("lived by" them in German).

To realize the various structures within one's language and habits, and even within one's own life and self is a difficult task. But Gebser says that it is a task that we cannot choose to ignore without losing ourselves. This means that our so-called "objective thinking" is not without consequences, is not innocent. That to live "objectively" means to give life to the horrors of nihilism combined with the know how of highly "efficient" weapons. It means that "objectivity" gets applied to "engineering humanity" whether it is in the behavioral sciences or the physical sciences. He asks of us whether or not we have had our fill of those horrors yet. Are we willing to settle into the comfort of our daily life or to take on the process of change? He offers as a guiding note that just as there is also a time to act, there is also the much neglected time of contemplation. In a world where know-how is overvalued, simple knowing must also be nurtured. Furthermore, he knew that thought was never simply a mental exercise restricted to one's writing. He calls upon us to realize that we are what we think.

== Terminology ==
=== Discontinuity ===
Gebser cautioned against using terms like evolution, progression, or development to describe the changes in structures of consciousness that he described.

Gebser traces the evidence for the transformations of the structure of consciousness as they are concretized in historical artifacts. He sought to avoid calling this process "evolutionary", since any such notion was illusory when applied to the "unfolding of consciousness." Gebser emphasized that biological evolution is an enclosing process which particularizes a species to a limited environment. The unfolding of awareness is, by contrast, an opening-up.

Any attempt to give a direction or goal to the unfolding of awareness is illusory in that it is based upon a limited, mentalistic, linear notion of time. Gebser notes that "to progress" is to move toward something and is thus also to move away from something else; therefore, progress is an inappropriate term to describe the structures of consciousness. Gebser wrote that the question as to the fate of humanity is still open, that for it to become closed would be the ultimate tragedy, but that such a closure remains a possibility. To Gebser, our fate is not assured by any notion of "an evolution toward", or by any kind of ideal way of being.

=== Space and time ===
Gebser notes that the various structures of consciousness are revealed by their relationship to space and time. For example, the mythical structure embodies time as cyclical/rhythmic and space as enclosed. The mental structure lives time as linear, directed or "progressive" and space becomes the box-like, vacuum-like homogeneous space of geometry.

== Influence ==
Gebser's work has formed the basis of a number of other studies and writers.

=== Ken Wilber ===
Ken Wilber referred to and quoted Gebser (along with many other theorists) in his 1981 Up from Eden and subsequent works. Wilber found Gebser's 'pioneering' work to align to his own model of consciousness, although Wilber finds evidence for additional later mystical stages beyond Gebser's integral structure.

=== William Irwin Thompson ===
In his 1996 Coming into Being, cultural critic William Irwin Thompson compared Gebser's structures of consciousness to Marshall McLuhan's conception of the development of communication technology from oral culture to script culture, alphabetic culture, print culture, and then to the emerging electronic culture. Thompson applied these insights to education theory in his 2001 Transforming History: A Curriculum for Cultural Evolution. In his 2004 Self and Society: Studies in the Evolution of Consciousness, and in collaboration with the mathematician Ralph Abraham, Thompson further related Gebser's structures to periods in the development of mathematics (arithmetic, geometric, algebraic, dynamical, chaotic) and in the history of music.

=== New Age ===
Gebser's integral philosophy is evaluated and applied to New Age thinking about a nascent shift in consciousness in the 2006 book 2012, The Return of Quetzalcoatl by Daniel Pinchbeck. In A Secret History of Consciousness (2003) cultural historian Gary Lachman links Gebser's work to that of other alternative philosophers of consciousness, such as Owen Barfield, Rudolf Steiner, Colin Wilson, and Jurij Moskvitin.

=== Other influences ===
Gebser's influence is also present in:

- Rudolf Bahro's Logik der Rettung (translated into English as Avoiding Social and Ecological Disaster),
- Bernardo Kastrup's Why Materialism Is Baloney
- Hugo Enomiya-Lassalle's Living in the New consciousness,
- Daniel Kealey's Revisioning Environmental Ethics,
- Georg Feuerstein's Wholeness or Transcendence,
- Eric Mark Kramer's Modern/Postmodern: Off the Beaten Path of Antimodernism,
- Grant Maxwell's The Dynamics of Transformation: Tracing an Emerging World View.

== Bibliography ==
=== English ===
- The Ever-Present Origin, authorized translation by Noel Barstad with Algis Mickunas (Athens: Ohio University Press, 1985, 1991)
- Anxiety, a Condition of Modern Man, (Visual series, 2) by Heiri Steiner and Jean Gebser (Paperback - 1962)

=== German ===
- Rilke und Spanien, 1936–1939
- Der grammatische Spiegel, 1944
- Ursprung und Gegenwart, 1949–1953
- Einbruch der Zeit, 1995

== Sources ==
- Arneson, Pat (2007), Jean Gebser's Cosmology". In: Perspectives on Philosophy of Communication. Edited by Pat Arneson, Purdue University Press
- Feuerstein, George (1987), Structures of Consciousness: The Genius of Jean Gebser: An Introduction and Critique
- Gebser, Jean (1944), Der grammatischer Spiegel
- Gebser, Jean (1991) [1985], The Ever-Present Origin, authorized translation by Noel Barstad with Algis Mickunas, Athens: Ohio University Press
- Hämmerli, Rudlof (1980), Nachwort des Herausgebers. In: Jean Gebser Gesamtausgabe Band VII, Novalis Verlag Gbr
- Mahood, Ed (1996), The Primordial Leap and the Present: The Ever-Present Origin – An Overview of the Work of Jean Gebser
- Mickunas, Algis (1997), An Introduction to the Philosophy of Jean Gebser. In: Integrative Investigations, January 1997, Volume 4 Number 1. Pages 8-21 (PDF)
- Thompson, William Irwin (1996), Coming Into Being: Artifacts and Texts in the Evolution of Consciousness
- Wilber, Ken (1996), Up From Eden. A Transpersonal View of Human Evolution
