= Deva (theosophy) =

Spiritual force

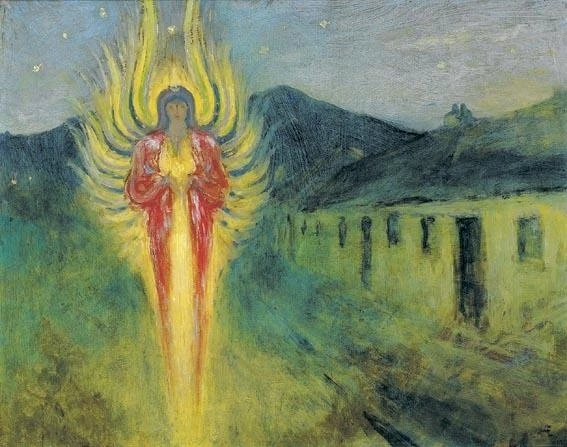
The Guardian of the Village, by George William Russell (1904)

A deva in theosophy and the New Age movement refers to any of the spiritual forces or beings behind nature. The origin of the word "deva" comes from Sanskrit. According to Theosophist Charles Webster Leadbeater, devas represent a separate evolution from that of humanity. The concept of devas as nature spirits was further developed in the writings of Theosophist Geoffrey Hodson. It is believed that there are numerous different types of devas with a population in the millions performing different functions on Earth to help the ecology function better. It is asserted devas can be observed by those whose third eye has been activated.

In addition, it is believed by Theosophists that there are millions of devas living inside the Sun, the indwelling solar deity of which Theosophists call the Solar Logos. These devas are called solar angels or sometimes solar devas or solar spirits. Sometimes, it is believed, they visit Earth and can be observed, like other devas, by humans whose third eyes have been activated. Theosophists believe that there are also devas living inside all the other stars besides Sol; these are called stellar angels.

In the Findhorn material, the term refers to archetypal spiritual intelligences behind species. In other words, the group soul of a species.

Some New Age sources use the term as a generic term to designate any being regarded as being composed of etheric matter--elementals, nature spirits (including the various types of nature spirits such as fairies, ondines, etc.). The pre-New Age etymology of the term is described in the article Deva (Hinduism).
