= Findhorn Foundation =

Charitable trust of intentional community

Coordinates: 57.653°N 3.592°W

Findhorn Foundation and Community
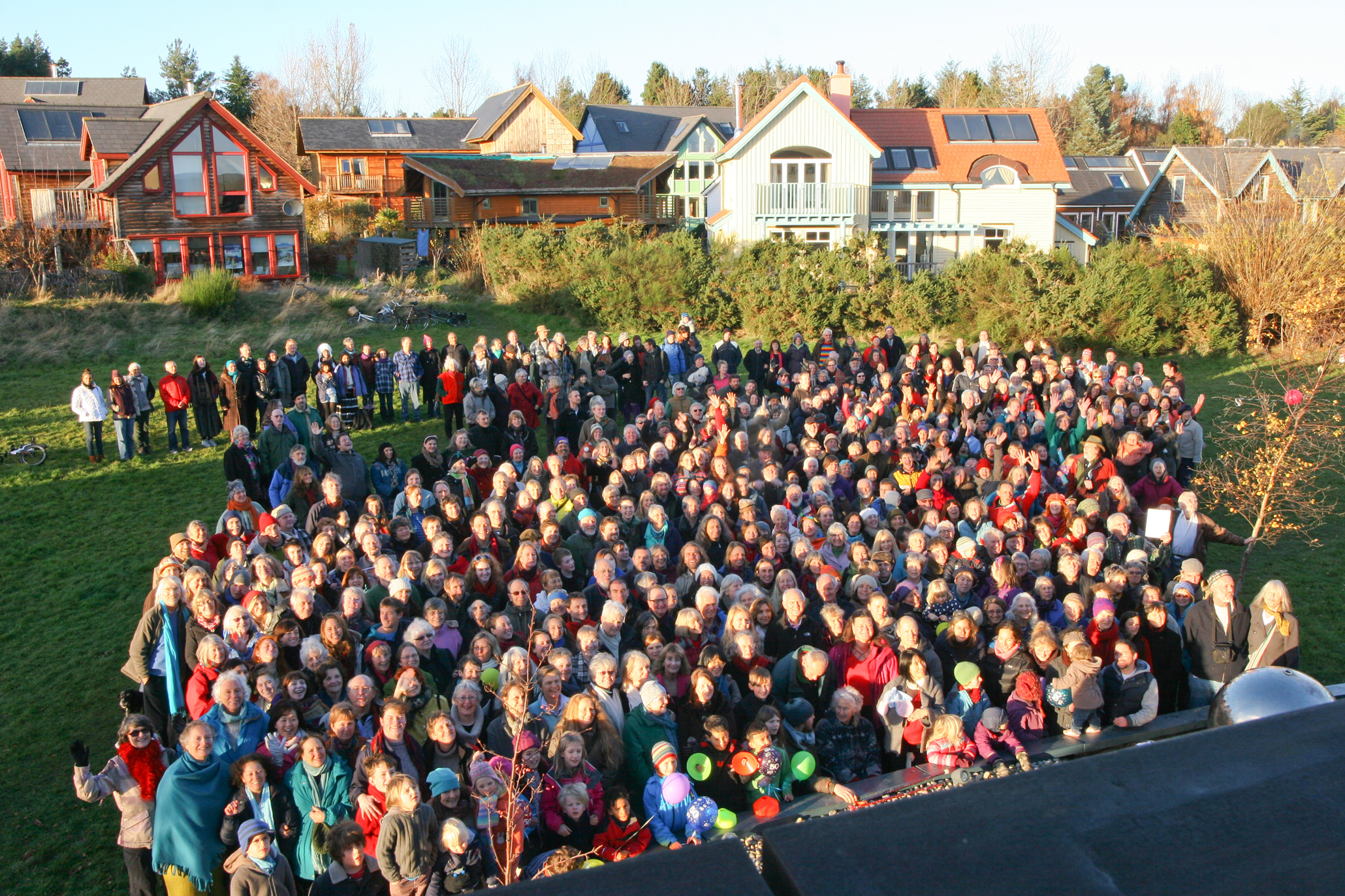
- Findhorn community members in front of the Ecovillage (2012)
- Formation: 1962; 64 years ago
- Purpose: Spirituality
- Headquarters: Findhorn, Moray, Scotland
- Region served: Worldwide
- Website: Findhorn Foundation

The Findhorn Foundation is a Scottish charitable trust registered in 1972, formed by the spiritual community at the Findhorn Ecovillage, one of the largest intentional communities in Britain. It has been home to thousands of residents from more than 40 countries. The Foundation closed all its educational programmes in September 2023 whereas the Findhorn community eco village at Findhorn houses about 40 community businesses such as the Findhorn Press and an alternative medicine centre.

Before the Findhorn Foundation in 1972, there was a Findhorn Trust as more people joined Eileen Caddy, Peter Caddy and Dorothy Maclean, who had arrived at the Caravan Park at Findhorn Bay on 17 November 1962. The Findhorn Foundation and surrounding Findhorn Ecovillage community at The Park, Findhorn, a village in Moray, Scotland, and at Cluny Hill in Forres, has been home to more than 400 people.

The Findhorn Foundation and the surrounding community have no formal doctrine or creed. The Foundation were offering a range of workshops, programmes and events in the environment of a working ecovillage and at Cluny Hill Hotel in nearby Forres.

Findhorn Ecovillage has been awarded UN Habitat Best Practice designation from the United Nations Centre for Human Settlements (HABITAT). It has held seminars of CIFAL Findhorn, a United Nations Institute for Training and Research (UNITAR), affiliated training centre for Northern Europe.

== History ==
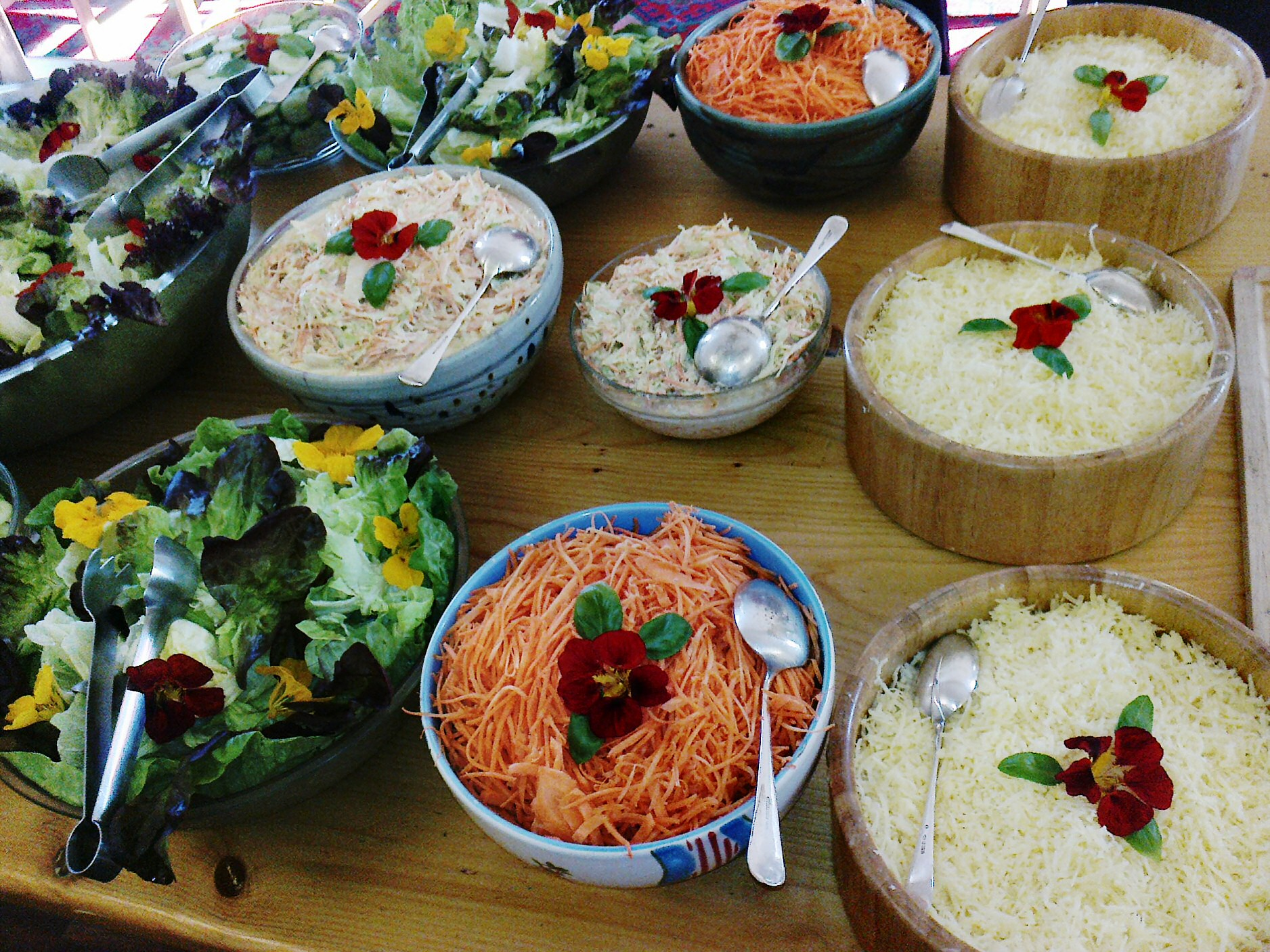
Decorated salads at Findhorn Foundation, Cluny Hill, 2011

=== Background ===
In the late 1940s Sheena Govan emerged as an informal spiritual teacher to a small circle that included her then-husband, Peter Caddy, and Dorothy Maclean. Eileen Caddy, as she became, who had a background in the Moral Rearmament (MRA) movement, joined them in the early 1950s. The group's principal focus was dedication to the 'Christ Within' and following God's guidance. In 1957 Peter and Eileen Caddy were appointed to manage the Cluny Hill Hotel near Forres, Maclean joining them as the hotel's secretary. Though now separated from Sheena Govan, whose relationship with Eileen Caddy had deteriorated, they continued with the practices she taught. In the early 1960s, Caddy, along with others who called themselves channellers, believed that they were in contact with extraterrestrials through telepathy, and prepared a landing strip for flying saucers at nearby Cluny Hill.

=== Findhorn caravan ===
In late 1962, Caddy's employment with the hotel chain that owned Cluny Hill, at the time he was working in the Trossachs, was terminated. He and Eileen settled in a caravan near the village of Findhorn; an annex was built in early 1963, so that Maclean could live close to the Caddy family. Eileen Caddy's direct relationship with God began with an experience in Glastonbury, where she recorded that she heard a voice say "Be Still and Know that I am God". Peter Caddy followed "an intuitive spontaneous inner knowing" and was influenced by theosophy and MRA, from which he developed methods of positive thinking and other methods he had learned in the Rosicrucian Order Crotona Fellowship.

Maclean initially followed practices from the Sufi group centred on the teachings of Inayat Khan, and from this developed her contact with the divine to focus upon communication with 'nature spirits' which she named as devas. The three of them agreed that Maclean's contacts should be made useful for the growing of food which was supplementing their income (the family at this point being entirely supported by Family Allowance). The Caddys credited the garden's success of producing "exceptionally large vegetables" – on these practices. More conventional explanations have been suggested by locals from outside the community who feel that the garden's successes can be explained by the unique microclimate of Moray or the substantial quantities of horse manure donated by a local farmer.

=== Expansion ===
Many others were involved with varying importance and influences in the early years, from Lena Lamont, part of Sheena Govan's circle, who lived in her caravan with her family and who shunned publicity, to those whom Peter Caddy met as he travelled in British New Age circles: among them Robert Ogilvie Crombie (ROC), who wrote of nature spirits in The Findhorn Garden; Sir George Trevelyan who formed the Wrekin Trust; Anthony Walter Dayrell Brooke, Liebie Pugh, and Joan Hartnell-Beavis. Through connections such as these and the distribution of Eileen Caddy's writings in the form of a booklet titled God Spoke to Me (1967), people came to live at the Caravan Park, eventually forming the 'Findhorn Trust' and the 'Findhorn Community'.

=== Residential spiritual education centre ===
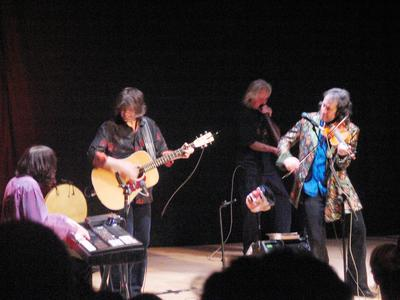
Findhorn attracts cultural and artistic events, such as Mike Scott and The Waterboys, shown here playing a concert at Universal Hall in 2004.

From 1969, following Eileen's guidance, Peter Caddy slowly devolved his day-to-day command. David Spangler became co-director of Education almost immediately after he arrived in 1970, which resulted in the gradual transformation into a centre of residential spiritual education with a permanent staff of over 100, and the establishment of the Findhorn Foundation in 1972. The following year. David Spangler and Maclean, with several other Findhorn Foundation members, left to found the Lorian Association near Seattle. By 1979 Peter and Eileen's marriage had disintegrated, and he left the Foundation. Eileen Caddy remained, and in 2004 was awarded an OBE. Peter Caddy died in a car crash in Germany on 18 February 1994. Eileen Caddy died at home on 13 December 2006. Maclean continued to give talks and workshops worldwide, visiting Findhorn regularly, and in August 2009 returned to Findhorn to live. She retired from public life in 2010.

The Universal Hall, serving as a theatre and concert hall, was built at The Park, the former caravan park site, between the years 1974 and 1984. The musical group The Waterboys, who had performed concerts in the hall, named their album Universal Hall after the structure.

An ethnographic study in the 1990s looked in detail at the 'Experience Week', which it called "the main entry point into Findhorn's ethos and lifestyle", noted that over 5,000 people attended Findhorn's courses annually, and called the Foundation an example of contemporary religious individualism.

=== 2021 fire, lockdown and transitions ===
In April 2021, a fire destroyed the Findhorn community centre and its sanctuary building. This was deliberately set by the community centre's manager, who had lived and worked at Findhorn for 16 years. After admitting the offence, he was ordered to carry out 300 hours of unpaid community work by Inverness Sheriff Court. Scotland's Sunday Post newspaper reported that he had been unhappy that he was among the 50 staff who would have to leave Findhorn in a restructuring, where many had worked long-term in return for housing, food and minimal wages. This restructuring was only partly due to the COVID-19 pandemic, according to the newspaper's report. It quoted other redundant Findhorn staff as affirming widespread "hurt and anger" within the Findhorn community about these restructuring plans.

The fire and the impact of COVID-19 lockdowns forced the Foundation to cease its educational activities by September 2023, marking a major change in its operational model. As the Foundation grappled with the financial strain of these compounded crises, it announced the decision to sell part of its properties in an effort to stabilize its financial situation. Further, it stated in July 2023 that it might have to let go of some of its 50 staff members. In September 2023 the Findhorn Foundation stopped offering courses, conferences, and educational programmes.

== Organisation ==
=== Community ===
The Foundation has been called a "spiritual utopian community". The community included an arts centre, shop, pottery, bakery, publishing company, printing company and other charitable organisations. All aimed to practice the founding principles of the community and together made up the New Findhorn Association (NFA). The NFA was formed in 1999 to provide a structure for all the people and organisations in the community. It included people from within a 50-mile radius of The Park, at Findhorn. Each year a council and two listener-conveners were elected by the membership of the NFA, who organise monthly community meetings to decide upon community-wide issues. By 2011, the NFA consisted of "320 members and 30 organisations". These included for example the Findhorn Press, the Phoenix Community Stores, the Trees for Life organisation, and educational centres including the Findhorn Foundation itself. (Note: The phrase "the Findhorn community" thus has at least 3 meanings: the Findhorn Foundation; the NFA; and the people of the village of Findhorn.)

=== Management structure ===
Each department was responsible for its own decisions. There was an 11-person management team which made "decisions which affect the organisation as a whole". The management team consulted with the council, which consisted of approximately 40 "committed members" who "meet regularly to discuss issues and participate in team-building activities". The management team was "responsible to the Trustees of the Foundation". The trustees met four times a year.

Decisions were made meditatively by "attunement", where "each person does their best to find an inner state of mind in which goodwill is foremost and any outcome will be one which serves as the best for all." "Most decisions are made unanimously or with a loyal minority." Failing this, decisions were passed with a 90% majority vote; decisions that did not reach this threshold were given time "for more information to be gathered", and the proposals were presented again later.

== Ecovillage ==
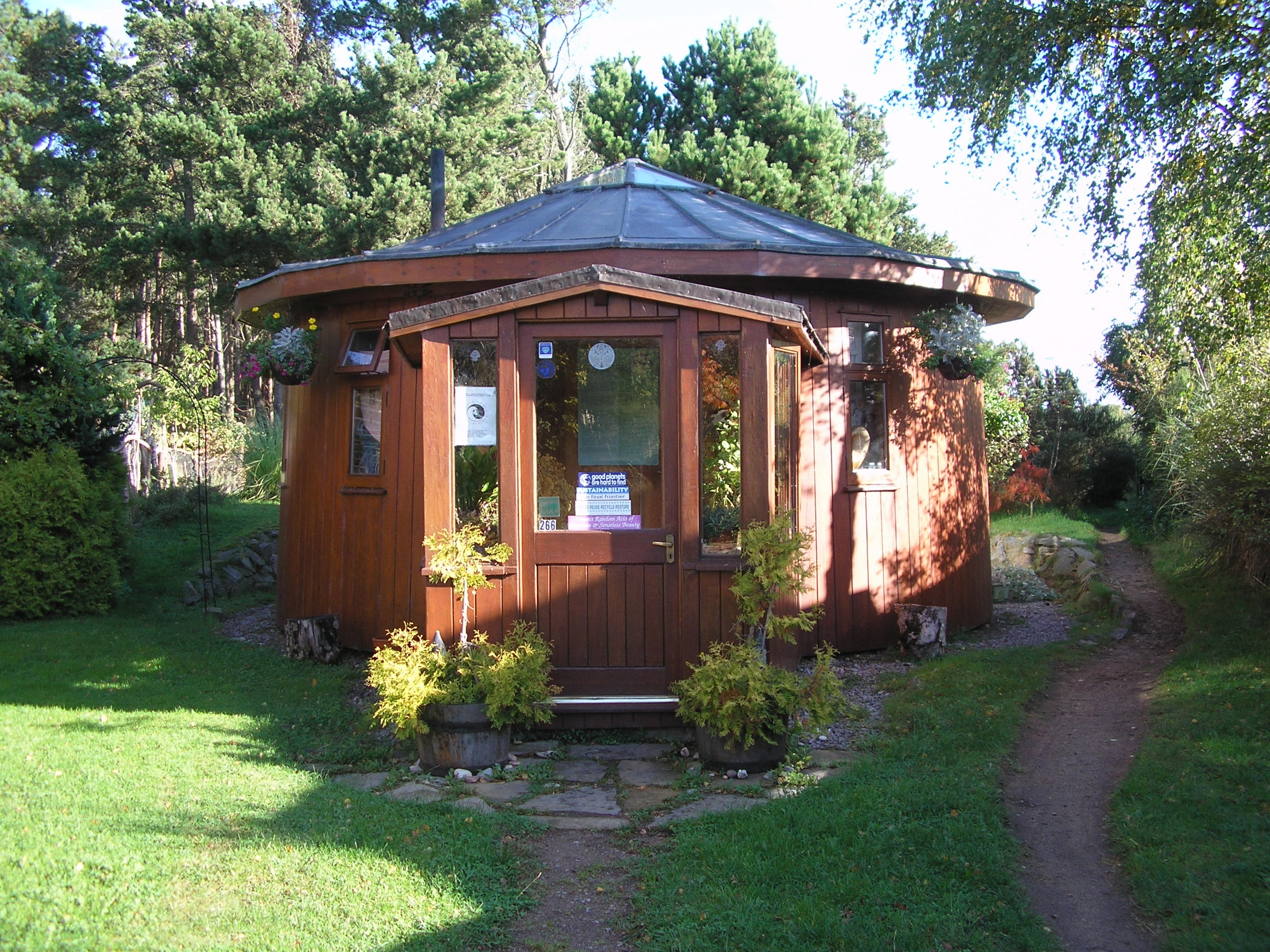
A Barrel House – the first dwelling in the Findhorn Ecovillage

Since the 1980s numerous organisations have started up in the vicinity of Findhorn which have an affiliation of some kind with the Findhorn Foundation. These include Ekopia, Moray Steiner School, the Phoenix Community Store, Trees for Life (Scotland) and The Isle of Erraid. Collectively they now form an ecovillage intended to demonstrate a positive model of a viable, sustainable human and planetary future. By 2005, Findhorn Ecovillage had around 450 resident members, and its residents were claimed to have the lowest recorded ecological footprint of any community in the industrialised world, at half of the UK average.

Physically, Findhorn Ecovillage is based at The Park, where the Foundation's belief in sustainability is expressed in the built environment with 'ecological' houses, innovative use of building materials such as local stone and straw bales, and applied technology in the Living Machine sewage treatment facility and electricity-generating wind turbines. The Ecovillage is intended to be a tangible demonstration of the links between the spiritual, social, ecological and economic aspects of life, for use as a teaching resource. It is a founder member of the Global Ecovillage Network (GEN) a non-profit organisation that links together a diverse worldwide movement of autonomous ecovillages and related projects. The Ecovillage project has received Best Practice designation from the United Nations Centre for Human Settlements (Habitat).

== Relationships with other NGOs ==
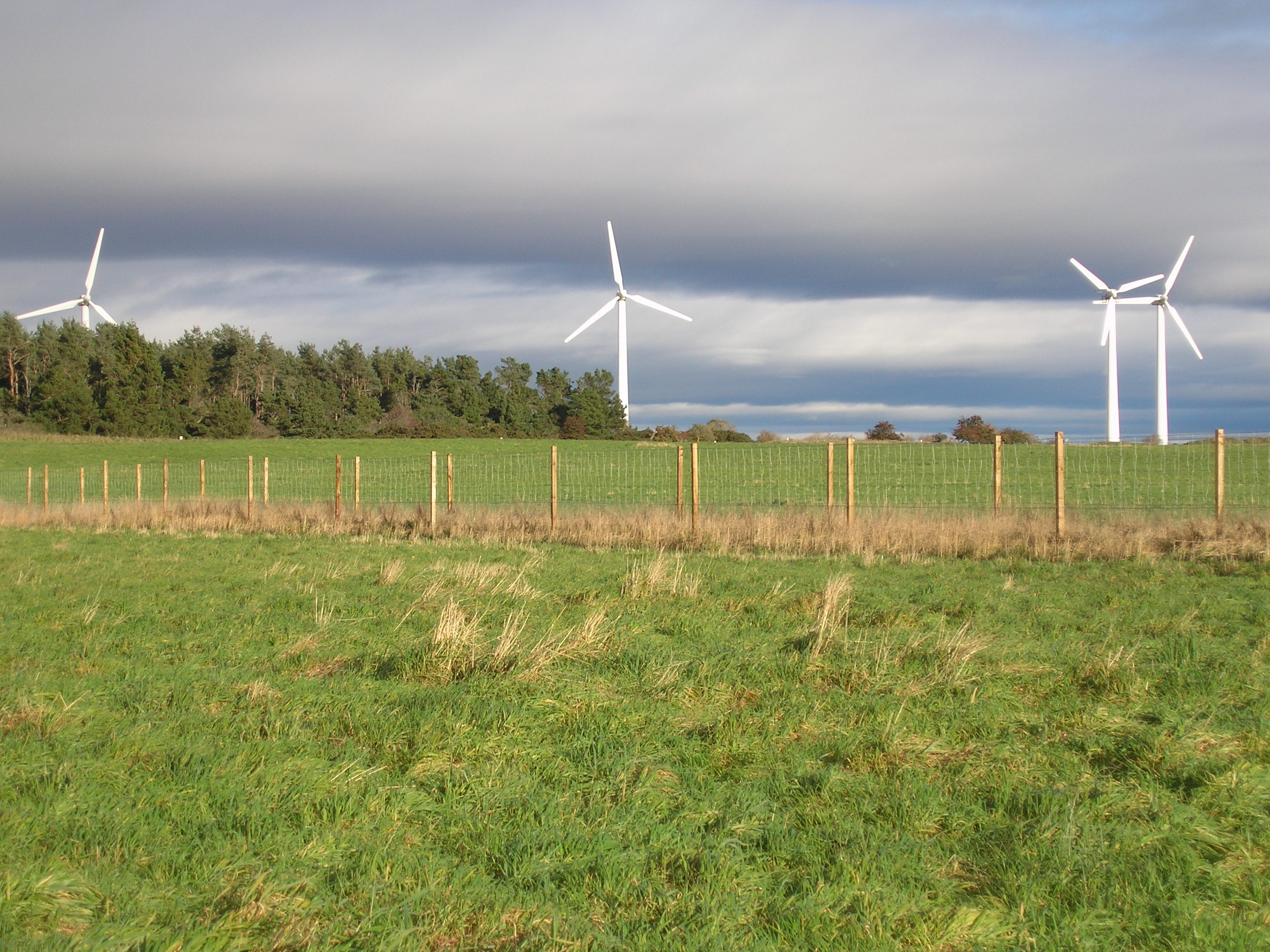
The wind turbines make the Ecovillage a net exporter of electricity.

The Findhorn Foundation is a member of the Conference of Non-Governmental Organizations (CONGO), attends the Sustainable Development Committee meetings and is a founding member of the following NGO groups active at the UN Headquarters in New York: The Earth Values Caucus, The Spiritual Caucus, and The NGO Committee on Spirituality, Values and Global Concerns.

A new sustainable development training facility, CIFAL (Note: CIFAL stands for "International Training Centre for Authorities and Leaders" (French: 'Centre International de Formation des Autorités et Leaders'".) Findhorn was launched in September 2006. This is a joint initiative between The Moray Council, the Global Ecovillage Network, the Findhorn Foundation and UNITAR.

== See also ==
- New Age communities
- Global Ecovillage Network
