= Peter Caddy =

Hotelier, co-founder of Findhorn Foundation

Peter Caddy (20 March 1917 – 18 February 1994) was a British caterer, hotelier, and with his wife Eileen Caddy and their friend Dorothy Maclean, co-founder of the Findhorn Foundation community.

== Life and work ==
Educated at Harrow, Caddy was apprenticed as a director with J. Lyons and Company, and was a member of the Rosicrucian Order Crotona Fellowship. On the outbreak of the Second World War he was commissioned as an officer with the Catering Branch of the Royal Air Force, where he served from 1940 until 1955. From 1957 until 1961 he was manager of the Cluny Hill Hotel near Forres, Scotland, now the training college of the Findhorn Foundation.

During a period of unemployment from 1962 onwards, Caddy began experimenting with organic gardening to supplement his family's food supply. The garden near Findhorn, Scotland, flourished to such a remarkable extent that it eventually attracted national attention. Peter Caddy attributed its success to his spiritual practices, and a community began to form around his family and their friend Dorothy Maclean. Much more information about the establishment and growth of the Findhorn Community is contained in Peter Caddy's autobiography.

In 1979 Caddy left the Findhorn Ecovillage community he had helped to found. He died in a car crash in Germany in 1994.
