= Findhorn Ecovillage =

Experimental architectural ecovillage in Scotland

Coordinates: 57.6539°N 3.5908°W

The Findhorn Ecovillage, known in the past as the Findhorn Community (also referred to as Ecovillage Findhorn) is an experimental intentional community project based at The Park, in Moray, Scotland, near the village of Findhorn. The community promotes sustainable living practices and explores the relationship between humans, nature, and spiritual values. Although historically much of the land was owned by the Findhorn Foundation, over the years much of the land originally part of that organisation has been now sold off to other organisations and private individuals – especially during and after the COVID-19 pandemic. One of the largest of these newer landowners is Ecovillage Findhorn CBS, a community benefit society started in 2024, which owns a number of areas including the Universal Hall, and is looking to buy or transfer further land and buildings originally held by the Findhorn Foundation.

The project's main aim is to demonstrate sustainable development in environmental, social, and economic terms. The community itself began in 1962, but Ecovillage work is generally seen as beginning in the early 1980s under the auspices of the Findhorn Foundation. It now includes a wide diversity of organisations and activities. Numerous different ecological techniques are in use, and the project has won a variety of awards, including the UN-Habitat Best Practice Designation in 1998 and 2018.

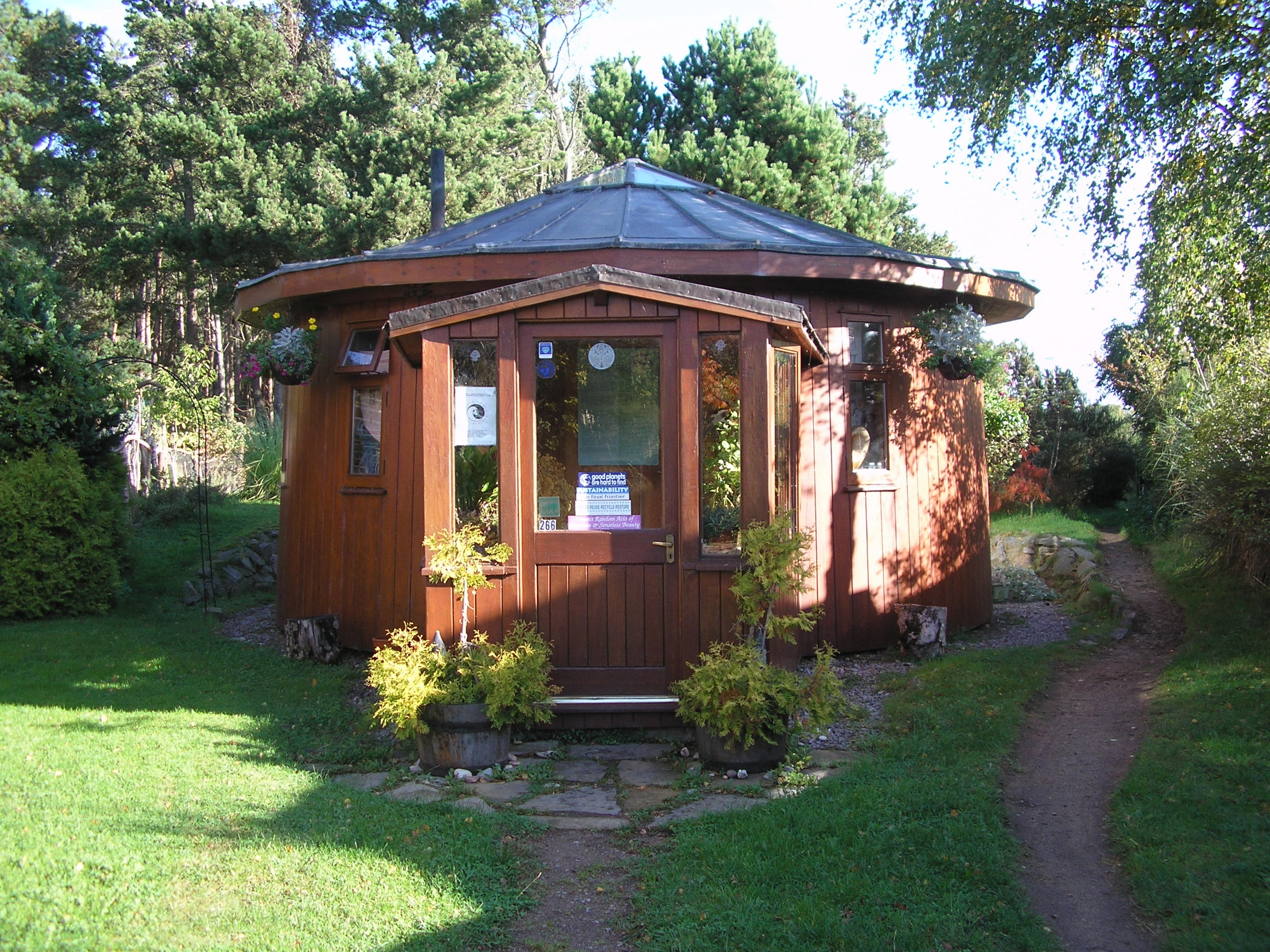
A Barrel House—the first new dwelling to be created at Findhorn Ecovillage

Moray's location in Scotland

An independent study concludes that the residents have the lowest ecological footprint of any community measured so far in the industrialised world and is also half of the UK average; however this did not include the Scope 3 emissions created in the past by its many guests flying in to attend its courses. The community is well aware of this paradox and seeks to find a way to earn income from more local sources, without the environmental impacts of flying. Although the project has attracted some controversy, the growing profile of environmental issues such as climate change has led to a degree of mainstream acceptance of its ecological ethos.

== History ==
The October 1982 Conference ‘Building a Planetary Village’ hosted by the Findhorn Foundation marked the beginning of serious attempts by the quasi-intentional community, which had existed at Findhorn since 1962 to demonstrate a human settlement that could be considered sustainable in environmental, social, and economic terms.

The term 'ecovillage' later came to be used to describe such experiments and in 1995 the first international conference of ecovillages, Ecovillages and Sustainable Communities for the 21st Century, was held in Findhorn. The Global Ecovillage Network (GEN) grew out of this conference.

At first almost all of the activities this involved, such as eco-house construction, a 75 kW Vestas wind turbine and an ecological waste water treatment system, were undertaken by the Findhorn Foundation itself, or its trading company New Findhorn Directions Ltd. However, from 1990 onwards a growing number of independent charities, businesses, small sister communities, independent practitioners and community bodies have grown up and significantly extended the size and diversity of ecological projects, some of which are listed below. As of 2005 the Ecovillage has around 450 members centred around The Park (the main campus on the southern edge of Findhorn), but also based at numerous locations in the nearby town of Forres and elsewhere in Moray.

Prior to the economic impacts listed above, and the resulting winding up of the Findhorn Foundation Trust, and loss of 150 jobs, the project supported approximately 300 jobs in the Findhorn/Forres area and provided a total aggregate economic impact in excess of £5 million per annum in the Highlands of Scotland as a whole.

The community buy-out of November 2024, via the community-owned Ecovillage Findhorn Community Benefit Society (EF), aims to restore jobs and regenerate economic impact over time; in partnership with the local council and others. EF raised £400,000 of inward investment to start this process via a community bond issue in autumn of 2024.

On 12 April 2021 a major fire destroyed the eco-village's community centre and main sanctuary; Police Scotland arrested a 49-year-old man. On 6 July 2021 Joseph Clark, the community centre manager, admitted setting the fire after being made redundant.

== Eco-projects ==
Ecovillages usually rely on a wide variety of approaches to minimise their ecological footprint. Some of the most important used at Findhorn are listed here although it is important to bear in mind that in any given situation the single largest factor is likely to be the attitudes of the residents rather than the technologies themselves. The national scale is far better researched than the micro scale, and at this level it is easy to observe that countries with similar levels of wealth may have quite different footprints.

=== Ecological building codes ===
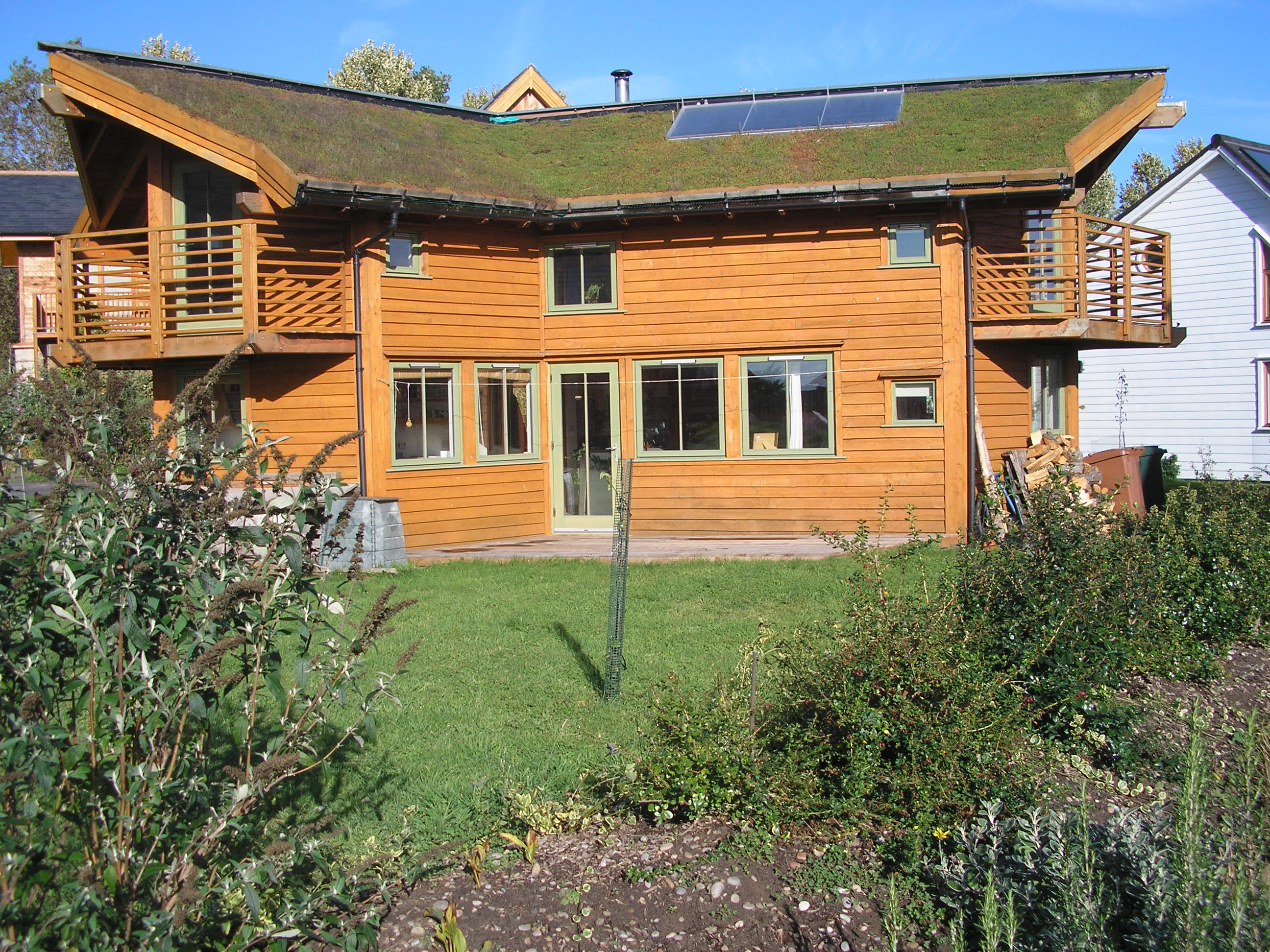
An eco-house at Findhorn with turf roof and solar panels

The site has a comprehensive building code that all new buildings are required to meet. It goes far beyond current UK building standards and includes features such as very efficient insulation (typically using products made from recycled paper), non-toxic organic paints, wood preservatives and boarding manufactured without the use of toxic glues or resins, and roofing with natural clay tiles.

There are a wide variety of other options used including low-energy light bulbs, 'breathing wall' construction allowing a controlled exchange of air & water vapour, conservation features, and locally sourced materials. Shared facilities such as laundry, kitchens, lounges etc. are encouraged, thus avoiding unnecessary duplication.

Most new buildings incorporate design features that invite passive solar radiation to reduce building heating needs, such as south-facing windows, conservatories and minimal wall openings on north walls. Sustainably harvested wood provides space heating for many homes both old and new, and an Ecovillage company supplies solar panels for domestic hot water heating to residential and commercial customers. The Highlands and Islands Community Energy Company awarded a grant in the mid-2000s for the installation of ground source heating for the proposed new Moray Arts Centre based at Findhorn.

Simply Build Green — Talbott (1993) — is based on research undertaken at Findhorn Ecovillage.

=== Living Machine ===
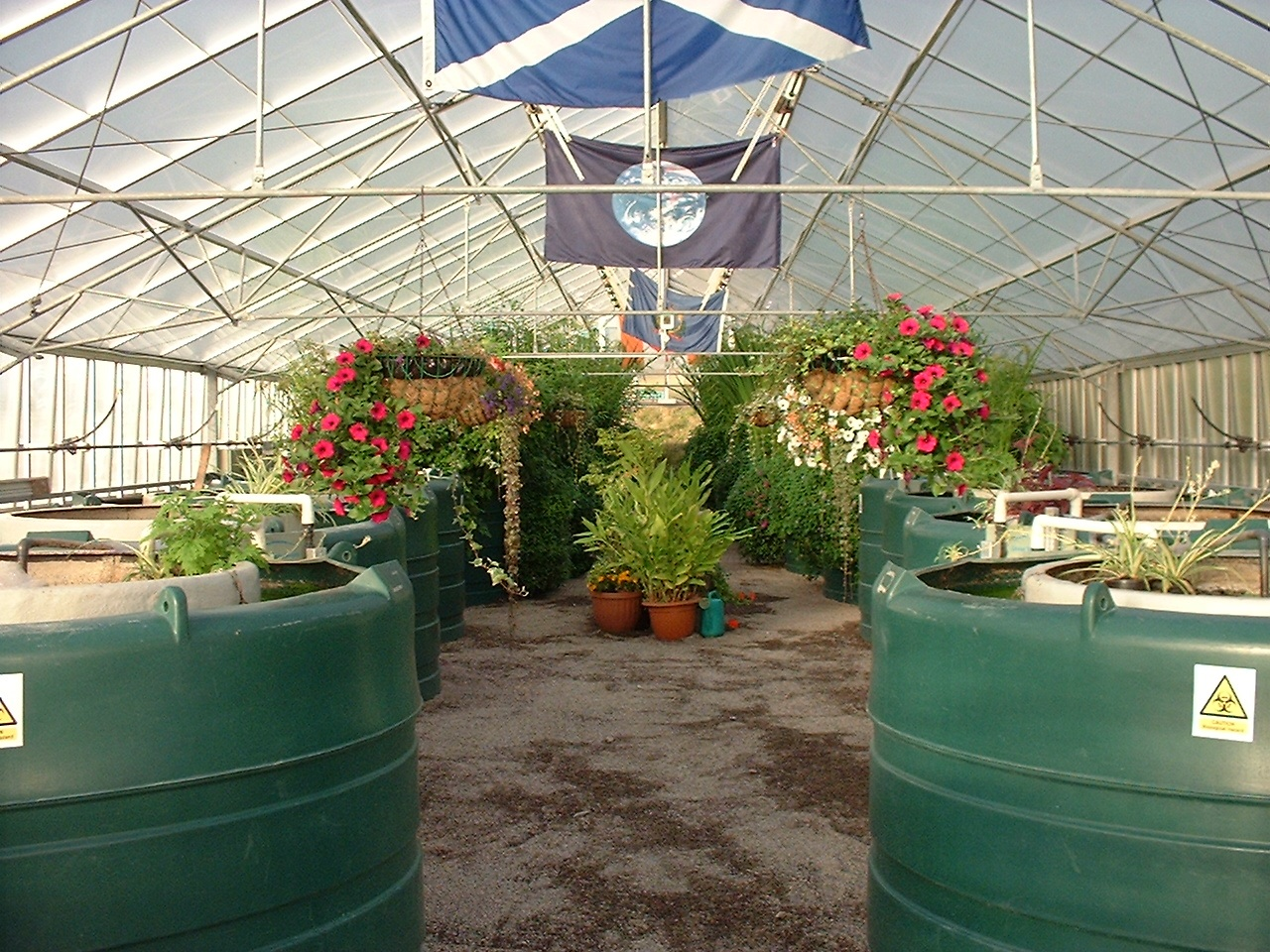
The Living Machine wastewater treatment plant at Findhorn

In 1995 Jonathon Porritt opened Europe's first Living Machine (also known as Eco-Restorers in The UK) at The Park campus. This is an ecologically engineered waste water treatment system which is designed to treat sewage from a population of up to 350 people and in common with a number of other such systems also provides a research and educational facility to promote the technology. It was constructed with assistance from the European Union. The invention of Canadian scientist John Todd, they use tanks containing diverse communities of bacteria, algae, micro-organisms, numerous species of plants and trees, snails, fish and other living creatures to treat the water. At the end of the series of tanks, the resulting water is pure enough to be returned to the local water table. Plans to use the water for irrigation have been considered but not implemented to date.

=== Organic food production ===
One of the most significant factors in the Ecovillage's low eco-footprint (see below) is its attitude to food production and consumption. Various smallholdings associated with the Ecovillage contribute to a community supported agriculture or 'box' scheme which provides organic produce for the local area, some of it grown using permaculture techniques. This horticulture '"provides more than 70% of the community's fresh food requirements" and Phoenix Community Stores, based at the Park, is one of the largest retailers of organic produce in northern Scotland.

=== Wind park ===
Another reason for the low ecological impact of the settlement is the presence of four Vestas wind turbines which can generate up to 750 kW. These make the Park settlement net exporters of electricity produced from renewable resources. The first V17 generator was installed in 1989 and three additional V29s were installed in March 2006. The original site was a caravan park and as a result the Ecovillage has its own private electricity grid. Most of the generation is used on-site with any surplus exported to the National Grid.

=== Eko currency ===
Eko
Value:	1 Eko = 1.00 £ sterling
Obverse Design:	Wind turbines
Reverse Design:	Low-cost housing
Designer:	Posthouse Printing
Design Date:	2006

In 2002, a local currency for the village, called the Eko, started operation. Launched by Ekopia, the community's development trust, it is accepted by almost all Ecovillage organizations. The Hygeia Foundation supported the launch. There are roughly £20,000 of notes in circulation and issuing them has enabled Ekopia to make low interest loans and donations to support various initiatives including an ecological guest facility, the wind park (above) and the local Youth Project. The current issue, launched in November 2017, is at par with sterling i.e. 1 Eko = £1, and notes are in one, five, ten and twenty denominations.

== Ecological Footprint Study ==
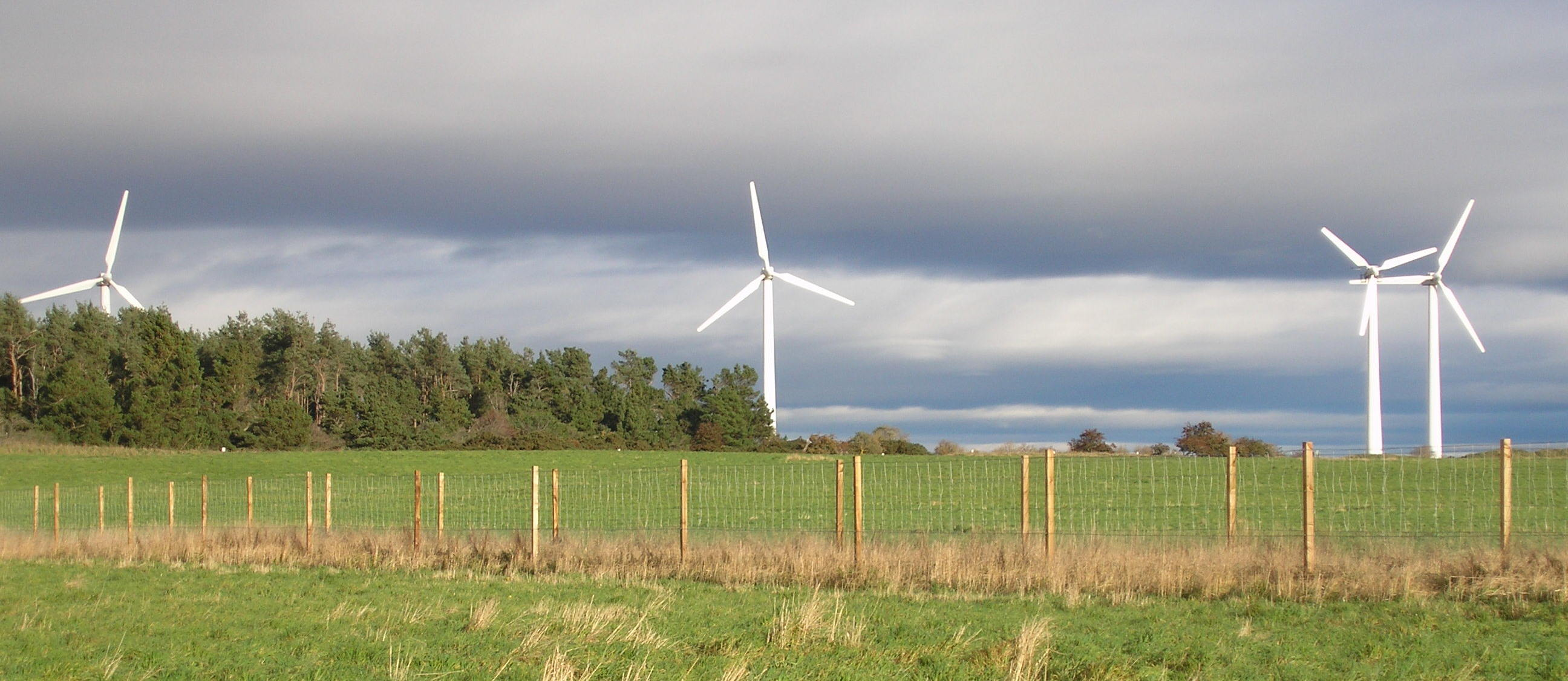
The wind turbines at Findhorn, which make the Ecovillage a net exporter of electricity

In October 2006 preliminary results of the ecological footprint study for the Findhorn Ecovillage undertaken by The Sustainable Development Research Centre of the UHI Millennium Institute in collaboration with the Stockholm Environment Institute confirmed that ecovillages can tread significantly more lightly on the Earth than more conventional communities. The study found that residents of The Park and the nearby campus of Cluny Hill College have, on average, a footprint of 2.71 hectares per capita, a little over half the UK national average of 5.4 hectares. (By comparison the comparable figure for the United States is 9.5gha, whilst Uzbekistan is rated at the average 'global earthshare' of 1.9gha). Of particular significance are the results relating to food, 'home and energy' use, and 'consumables and personal possessions' which have 35%, 27% and 44% of the national average respectively. Findhorn residents have an eco-footprint some 13% lower than those at the London eco-housing development, BedZED.

== Awards, UN connections and critiques ==
- In September 1995 The Findhorn Ecological Village Project was awarded the 'We the Peoples 50 Communities' award given by the Friends of the United Nations as part of the 50th Anniversary of the UN Celebrations.
- In October 1998 the Ecovillage Project, together with other 100 leadership Initiatives "which are inspiring innovative action on Earth", received Best Practice Designation from the United Nations Centre for Human Settlements — UNCHS (Habitat) and Dubai Municipality.

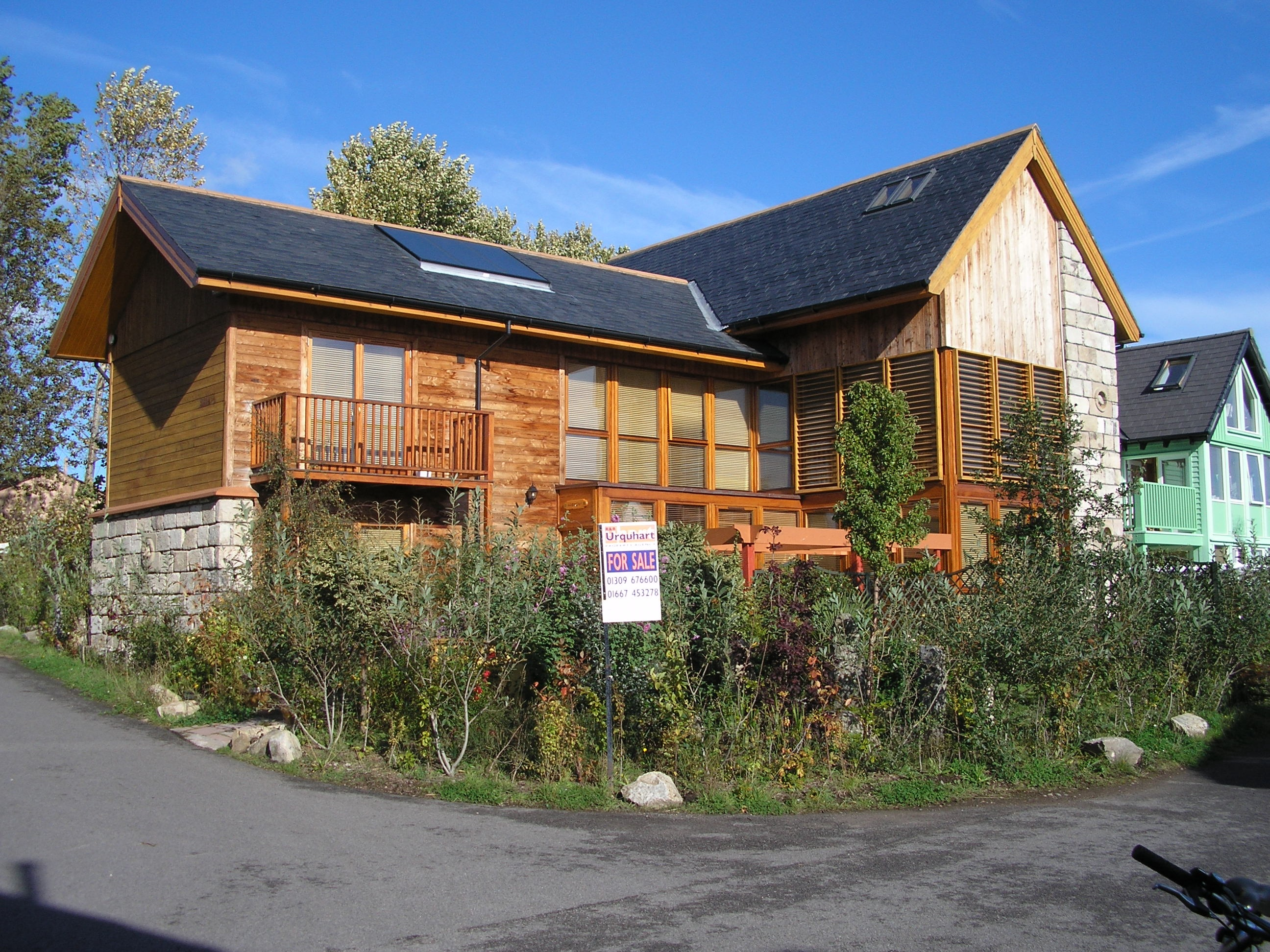
A larger, 200 m^{2} plus Eco-house

- In September 2000 the conservation charity Trees for Life received the Millennium Marque Award in recognition of its work in helping to restore the Caledonian Forest in Glen Affric.
- The following year the United Nations Environment Programme noted that "most of the problems identified by Agenda 21 have their roots at the local level, therefore UNEP appreciates your significant contribution at the local level to models for holistic and sustainable living in harmony with the environment."

Various critiques exist in print, although these tend to concentrate on the eclectic spirituality of the Findhorn Foundation rather than the environmental aspects of the Ecovillage. There is a statement of core values for the Ecovillage and its associated community called ‘Common Ground’ but other than affirming a commitment to "active spiritual practice" (which is diversely understood and interpreted) it concentrates largely on preferred interpersonal behaviours rather than prescribing a spiritual philosophy. Objections were raised by a local pressure group against the expansion of the wind park.

== See also ==
- Sustainable development in Scotland
- Renewable energy in Scotland
- Centre for Alternative Technology
- Diggers and Dreamers
