= Cluny Hill =

Hill on the East side of Forres, Scotland

Coordinates: 57.6114°N 3.6007°W

Designations

Inventory of Gardens and Designed Landscapes in Scotland
- Official name: Grant Park and Cluny Hill
- Designated: 30 March 2006
- Reference no.: GDL00201

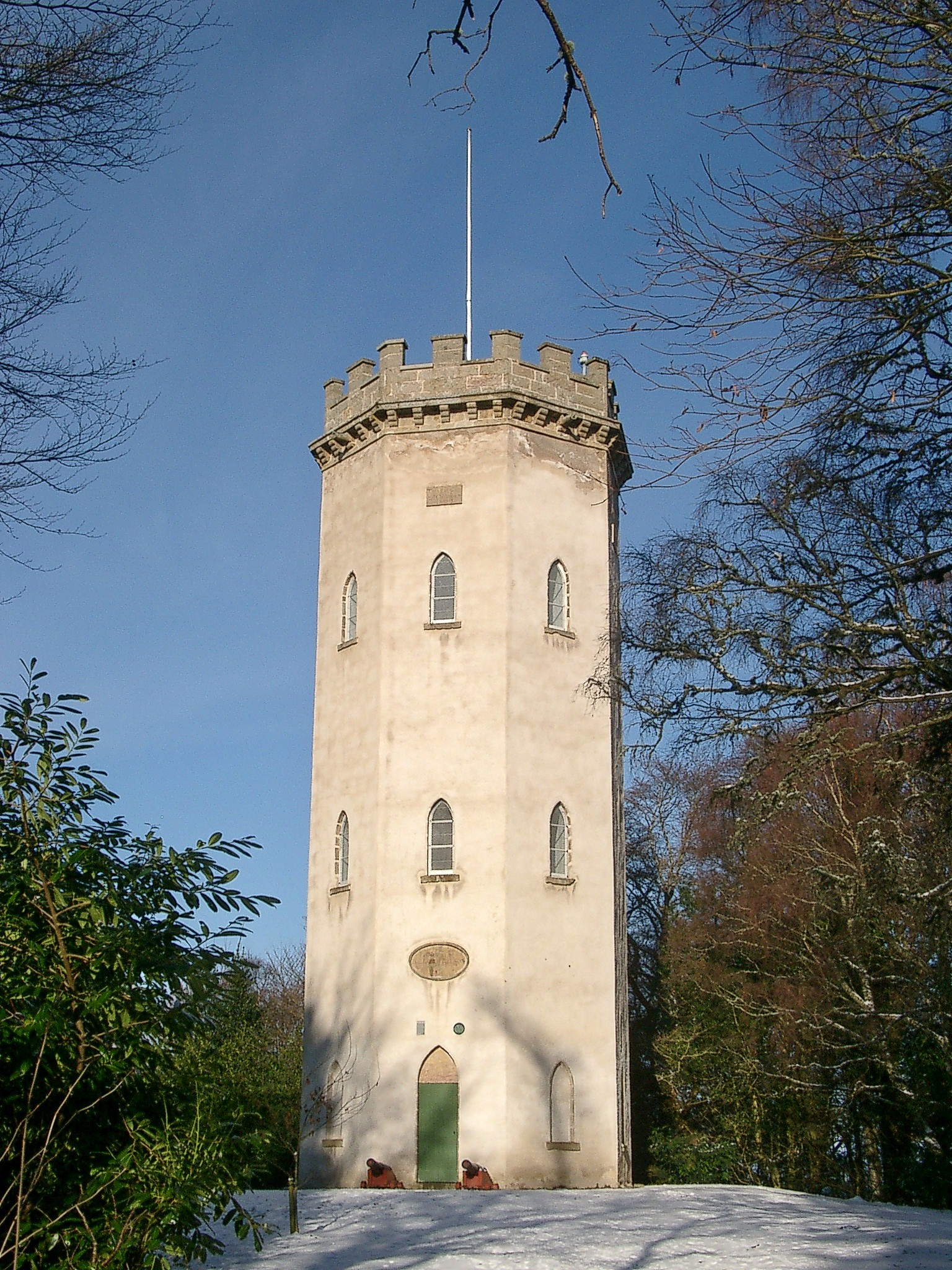
Nelson's Tower

Cluny Hill is a hill on the East side of Forres, Scotland.

At the top of Cluny Hill is Nelson's Tower, built in 1806 to commemorate Admiral Lord Nelson and his victory at Trafalgar. The Tower is open to the public.

Writing in 1807 the antiquarian George Chalmers recorded the existence of a hillfort on the top of the hill, with "a strong earth rampart and a ditch 12ft wide, enclosing an area of more than 6 acres." He further noted "a small 'post' with bank and ditch enclosing an area 10ft square" lying to the south. The Ordnance Survey recorded the hill as the site of a "British Camp" in 1938, but by 1963 no obvious trace of a fort remained. The existence of the hillfort, which extended to 3.6 hectares (8.9 acres), was confirmed in 2017.

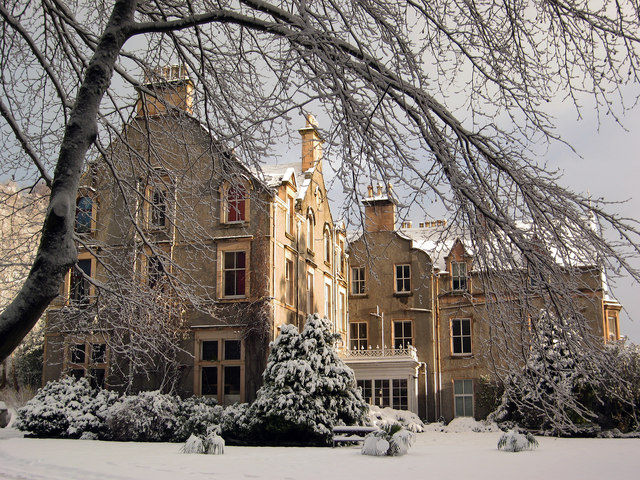
Cluny Hill College

The nearby Cluny Hill Hydropathic Establishment opened in 1864. The opening of Cluny Hill signalled a transition in the hydropathic movement that prevailed in the 19th century.

What marked it out were three features. It was an enterprise capable of accommodating a much larger clientele; some 65 visitors were in residence in the first July. Secondly, as the visitor's lists show, the clientele was drawn from the immediate locality and further afield: Edinburgh and Glasgow in the main, but also locations like Cheshire and the Isle of Wight. Third, the size of the venture required a high level of capitalization and consequently the promotion was handled through a limited company rather than private partnerships.

After being commandeered for troop use during World War II it reopened in 1947 under North British Hotels Ltd. as the Cluny Hill Hotel. By 1975 it was deemed unprofitable and was sold to the Findhorn Foundation for £60,000. The new owners renamed it Cluny Hill College.

== See also ==
- Doune of Relugas - a small hillfort near Conicavel
- Dunearn - a larger hillfort further up the Findhorn valley at Dulsie Bridge.
