= James Sethian =

American mathematician

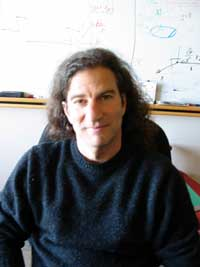
- Photographed by Adalien Hulmer (2004)
- Born: May 10, 1954 (age 72); Washington, D.C., United States
- Known for: Level-set method Fast marching method Image segmentation Applied mathematics
- Awards: Norbert Wiener Prize (2004), ICIAM Pioneer Prize (2011)
- Scientific career
- Fields: Mathematics
- Workplaces: Berkeley, Berkeley Lab; Courant Inst. Princeton
- Doctoral advisor: Alexandre Chorin, Peter Lax

James Albert Sethian is a professor of mathematics at the University of California, Berkeley and the head of the Mathematics Group at the United States Department of Energy's Lawrence Berkeley National Laboratory.

Sethian was born in Washington, D.C., on May 10, 1954. He received a B.A. (1976) from Princeton and a M.A. (1978) and Ph.D (1982) from Berkeley under the direction of Alexandre Chorin. Beginning in 1983, he was a National Science Foundation postdoctoral fellow, lastly at the Courant Institute under Peter Lax. In 1985, he returned to Berkeley to join the mathematics faculty, where he is currently a full professor. Sethian was elected member of the National Academy of Engineering in 2008 as well as the National Academy of Sciences in 2013. Sethian has acted as Interim Director Research at Thinking Machines Corporation and held visiting positions at the National Center for Atmospheric Research and the National Institute of Standards and Technology.

== Work ==
Sethian has worked on numerical algorithms for tracking moving interfaces for over three decades, starting with his seminal 1982 work on curve and surface propagation in combustion, and his 1985 work on entropy conditions, curvature, stability of numerical algorithms. This work led to development of the level-set method in 1988, which was developed jointly with Stanley Osher.

These are numerical algorithms for tracking moving interfaces in complex situations, and have proved instrumental in a wide collection of applications, including semiconductor processing, fluid mechanics, medical imaging, computer graphics, and materials science.

Jointly with D. Adalsteinsson, Sethian then introduced the idea of adaptivity to level set methods, in which computational labor is focused on the evolving front: their Adaptive Narrow Band level set method and its variants are what makes level set methods efficient and practical, and are the most common form of these techniques in practice today.

Together with Andreas Wiegmann, Sethian pioneered the use of the Level-set method and the Immersed-interface method in the field of Topology optimization.

Together with Alexander Vladimirsky, Sethian developed a class of Dijkstra-like ordered upwind methods for solving static Hamilton–Jacobi equations. In the case of an Eikonal equation, the first method to do so was developed by Jon N. Tsitsiklis using a control-theoretic approach: followed shortly by Sethian's work on high-order finite-difference Dijkstra-like Fast Marching Methods. Ravikanth Malladi and Sethian pioneered the application of these techniques to image segmentation, Ron Kimmel and Sethian introduced them to robotic navigation and extended them to curved domains, and Mihai Popovici and Sethian were the first to use them as fast wave solvers in geophysical seismic imaging.

Together with Sergey Fomel, Sethian invented Escape Arrival Methods for computing multiple arrivals in wave propagation and geophysical imaging.

Algorithms based on the work of Sethian and his colleagues are now commonly used throughout science and engineering. Examples include informing engineers how to design more precise ink jet plotters, allowing physicians to analyze brain and cardiac images, aiding oil companies in locating petroleum reserves, and telling process engineers how to build reliable computer chips.

He maintains the "level set methods and fast marching methods" webpage , which is a popular resource for these methods, and provides a variety of applets, movies, and explanations for both the popular and technical audiences.

== Awards ==
Sethian won the ICIAM Pioneer Prize in 2011 for pioneering work, introducing applied mathematical methods and scientific computing techniques to an industrial problem area and new scientific fields of applications. Sethian was elected member of the National Academy of Engineering in 2008 for the development of efficient methods of tracking moving interfaces. He received the Norbert Wiener Prize in Applied Mathematics in 2004, jointly awarded by the Society for Industrial and Applied Mathematicians (SIAM) and the American Mathematical Society (AMS). This prize was awarded "for an outstanding contribution to applied mathematics in the highest and broadest sense." Sethian was honoured "for his seminal work on the computer representation of the motion of curves, surfaces, interfaces, and wave fronts, and for his brilliant applications of mathematical and computational ideas to problems in science and engineering." Previous recipients include Richard Bellman, Peter Lax, Alexandre Chorin, Jerrold Marsden, Tosio Kato, Gerald Whitham, Arthur Winfree, and Harold Widom.

Sethian, in collaboration with Robert Saye, won the Cozzarelli Prize of the Proceedings of the National Academy of Sciences in 2012 for the best paper published that year in engineering and applied sciences in that journal. In 2012 he became a fellow of the American Mathematical Society. In addition he has received the SIAM I.E. Block Community Lecture Prize.

== Books ==
- Vortex Methods and Vortex Motion
- Level Set Methods: Evolving Interfaces in Geometry, Fluid Mechanics, Computer Vision and Materials Sciences
- Level Set Methods and Fast Marching Methods
