= Scientific American Library =

Popular science book series

The Scientific American Library is a book series of popular science written by scientists known for their popular writings and originally published by Scientific American books from 1983 to 1997. These books were not sold in retail stores, but as a Book of the Month Club selection priced from $24.95 to $32.95.

Books include:

- Powers of Ten: A Book About the Relative Size of Things in the Universe and the Effect of Adding Another Zero by Philip Morrison
- Human Diversity by Richard Lewontin
- The Discovery of Subatomic Particles by Steven Weinberg
- The Science of Musical Sound by John Robinson Pierce
- Fossils and the History of Life by George Gaylord Simpson
- The Solar System: The Sun, Planets and Life by Roman Smoluchowski
- On Size and Life by Thomas A. McMahon & John Tyler Bonner
- Perception by Irvin Rock
- Constructing the Universe by David Layzer
- The Second Law by P. W. Atkins
- A Guided Tour of the Living Cell, Volume 1 by Christian de Duve
- A Guided Tour of the Living Cell, Volume 2 by Christian de Duve
- Mathematics and Optimal Form by Stefan Hildebrandt & Anthony Joseph Tromba
- Fire by John W. Lyons
- Sun and Earth by Herbert Friedman
- Einstein's Legacy : The Unity of Space and Time by Julian Schwinger
- Islands by Henry William Menard
- Drugs and the Brain by Solomon H. Snyder
- The Timing of Biological Clocks by Arthur T. Winfree
- Extinction by Steven M. Stanley
- Molecules by P. W. Atkins
- Eye, Brain, and Vision by David H. Hubel
- Science of Structures and Materials by J. E. Gordon
- Sand by Raymond Siever
- The Honey Bee by James L. Gould
- Animal Navigation by Talbot H. Waterman
- Sleep by J. Allan Hobson
- From Quarks to the Cosmos : Tools of Discovery by Leon M. Lederman & David N. Schramm
- Sexual Selection by James L. Gould
- The New Archaeology and the Ancient Maya by Jeremy A. Sabloff
- A Journey into Gravity and Spacetime by John Archibald Wheeler
- The Science of Telecommunications by John Robinson Pierce
- Beyond the Third Dimension: Geometry, Computer Graphics, and Higher Dimensions by Thomas F. Banchoff
- Discovering Enzymes by David Dressler
- The Science of Words by George Armitage Miller
- Atoms, Electrons, and Change by P. W. Atkins
- Viruses by Arnold J. Levine
- Diversity and the Tropical Rain Forest by John Terborgh
- Stars by James B. Kaler
- Exploring Biomechanics: Animals in Motion by R. McNeill Alexander
- Chemical Communication by William C. Agosta
- Genes and the Biology of Cancer by Harold Varmus
- Supercomputing and the Transformation of Science by William J. Kaufmann III
- Molecules and Mental Illness by Samuel H. Barondes
- Exploring Planetary Worlds by David Morrison
- Earthquakes and Geological Discovery by Bruce A. Bolt
- The Origin of Modern Humans by Roger Lewin
- The Evolving Coast by Richard A. Davis
- Life processes of plants by Arthur W. Galston
- Images of Mind by Michael I. Posner
- The Animal Mind by James L. Gould
- Mathematics: The Science of Patterns: The Search for Order in Life, Mind, and the Universe by Keith Devlin
- A Short History of the Universe by Joseph Silk
- The Emergence of Agriculture by Bruce D. Smith
- Atmosphere, Climate, and Change by T. E. Graedel
- Aging: A Natural History by Robert E. Ricklefs
- Investigating Disease Patterns: The Science of Epidemiology by Paul D. Stolley
- Gravity's Fatal Attraction: Black Holes in the Universe by Mitchell Begelman
- Conservation and Biodiversity by Andrew P. Dobson
- Plants, People, and Culture: The Science of Ethnobotany by Michael J. Balick
- Life at Small Scale: The Behavior of Microbes by David B. Dusenbery
- Patterns in Evolution: The New Molecular View by Roger Lewin
- Cycles of Life: Civilization and the Biosphere by Vaclav Smil
- Cosmic Clouds: Birth, Death, and Recycling in the Galaxy by James B. Kaler
- The Elusive Neutrino: A Subatomic Detective Story by Nickolas Solomey
- Lasers - Harnessing the Atoms Light by James P. Harbison
- Consciousness by J. Allan Hobson
- Evolving Brains by John Morgan Allman
- Memory: From Mind to Molecules by Larry R. Squire
- Visual Computing by Richard Mark Friedhoff

== See also ==
- Princeton Science Library
- Science Masters series
