= Alan Gaius Ramsay McIntosh =

Australian mathematician

Alan McIntosh
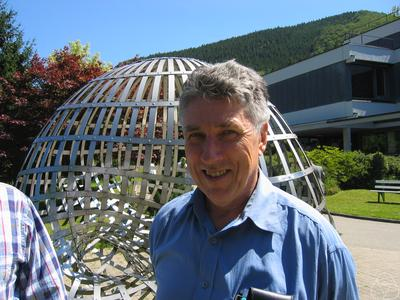
- Alan McIntosh in 2004
- Born: 17 January 1942; Sydney, Australia
- Died: 8 August 2016 (aged 74)
- Scientific career
- Fields: Harmonic analysis Partial differential equations
- Workplaces: Macquarie University; Australian National University

Alan Gaius Ramsay McIntosh (17 January 1942 – 8 August 2016) was an Australian mathematician who dealt with analysis (harmonic analysis, partial differential equations). He was a professor at the Australian National University in Canberra.

McIntosh was born in Sydney, New South Wales on 17 January 1952. He studied at the University of New England with a bachelor's degree in 1962 (as a student he also received the University Medal ) and PhD in 1966 with Frantisek Wolf at the University of California, Berkeley, for his thesis "Representation of Accretive Bilinear Forms in Hilbert Space by Maximal Accretive Operator ". At Berkeley, he was also a student of Tosio Kato. As a post-doctoral student, he was at the Institute for Advanced Study and from 1967 he taught at Macquarie University, moving to the Australian National University in 1999. In 2014 he became emeritus.

McIntosh was involved in solving the Calderon conjecture in the theory of singular integral operators.

In 2002, he solved with Pascal Auscher, Michael T. Lacey, Philipp Tchamitchian and Steve Hofmann the open Kato root problem for elliptic differential operators.

He also worked on singular integral operators, boundary value problems of partial differential equations with applications (such as scattering theory of the Maxwell equations in irregular areas), spectral theory and functional calculus of operators in Banach spaces, analysis with Clifford algebras, barriers for the heat kernel equation and functional calculus for elliptic partial differential operators.

In 1986 he became a fellow of the Australian Academy of Science, whose Hannan Medal he received in 2015. In 2002 he received the Moyal Medal from Macquarie University.
