= Steve Hofmann =

Steve Hofmann is a mathematician who helped solve the famous Kato's conjecture. Said Hofmann, “It's a problem that has interested me since I was a graduate student... It was one of the biggest open problems in my field and everybody thought it was too hard and wouldn't be solved. I had toyed with it for years and then put in three years of very serious work before hitting the key breakthrough.”

Hofmann, Curators' professor at the University of Missouri, worked alongside other prominenent mathematicians (Pascal Auscher, Michael Lacey, John Lewis, Alan McIntosh and Philippe Tchamitchian) to solve this problem, one that was put into place in the early 1950s by Tosio Kato, a Mathematician at The University of California at Berkeley. Hofmann received his PhD from the University of Minnesota, Twin Cities.

He delivered an invited address at the 2006 International Congress of Mathematicians in Madrid. In 2012 he became a fellow of the American Mathematical Society.
