= Chichilnisky =

Chichilnisky is a surname. Notable people with the name include:

- E.J. Chichilnisky (born 1965), Argentine-American neurobiologist
- Graciela Chichilnisky (born 1946), Argentine-American economist
