= Norbert Wiener Prize in Applied Mathematics =

The Norbert Wiener Prize in Applied Mathematics is a $5000 prize awarded, every three years, for an outstanding contribution to "applied mathematics in the highest and broadest sense." It was endowed in 1967 in honor of Norbert Wiener by MIT's mathematics department and is provided jointly by the American Mathematical Society and Society for Industrial and Applied Mathematics and first issued in 1970. The recipient of the prize has to be a member of one of the awarding societies.

== Winners ==
- 1970: Richard E. Bellman
- 1975: Peter D. Lax
- 1980: Tosio Kato and Gerald B. Whitham
- 1985: Clifford S. Gardner
- 1990: Michael Aizenman and Jerrold E. Marsden
- 1995: Hermann Flaschka and Ciprian Foias
- 2000: Alexandre J. Chorin and Arthur Winfree
- 2004: James A. Sethian
- 2007: Craig Tracy and Harold Widom
- 2010: David Donoho
- 2013: Andrew Majda
- 2016: Constantine M. Dafermos
- 2019: Marsha Berger and Arkadi Nemirovski
- 2022: Eitan Tadmor
- 2025: Robert McCann

== See also ==
- List of mathematics awards
- Prizes named after people
