= Pascal Auscher =

French mathematician

Pascal Auscher is a French mathematician working at University of Paris-Sud. Specializing in harmonic analysis and operator theory, he is mostly known for, together with Steve Hofmann, Michael Lacey, Alan McIntosh and Philippe Tchamitchian, solving the famous Kato's conjecture.
