= Ralph Abraham =

Ralph Abraham may refer to:

- Ralph Abraham (mathematician) (1936–2024), American mathematician
- Ralph Abraham (politician) (born 1954), American physician and politician from Louisiana
