= Kato's conjecture =

Kato's conjecture is a mathematical problem named after mathematician Tosio Kato, of the University of California, Berkeley. Kato initially posed the problem in 1953.

Kato asked whether the square roots of certain elliptic operators, defined via functional calculus, are analytic. The full statement of the conjecture as given by Auscher et al. is: "the domain of the square root of a uniformly complex elliptic operator $L =-\mathrm{div} (A\nabla)$ with bounded measurable coefficients in R^{n} is the Sobolev space H^{1}(R^{n}) in any dimension with the estimate $||\sqrt{L}f||_{2} \sim ||\nabla f||_{2}$".

The problem remained unresolved for nearly a half-century, until in 2001 it was jointly solved in the affirmative by Pascal Auscher, Steve Hofmann, Michael Lacey, Alan McIntosh, and Philippe Tchamitchian.
