= Anthony Joseph Tromba =

American mathematician (b. 1943)

- Known for: Vector Calculus (1976)

Academic background
- Education: Cornell University (B.Sc. 1965); Princeton University (M.A. 1967, PhD 1968)
- Thesis: Degree theory on Banach manifolds (1968)
- Doctoral advisor: Stephen Smale

Academic work
- Discipline: Mathematics
- Sub-discipline: Partial differential equations; Differential geometry; Calculus of variations
- Institutions: University of California, Santa Cruz

Anthony Joseph Tromba (born August 10, 1943 in Brooklyn, New York City) is an American mathematician, specializing in partial differential equations, differential geometry, and the calculus of variations.

Tromba received from Cornell University his bachelor's degree in 1965 and from Princeton University his master's degree in 1967 and his doctorate in 1968 under Stephen Smale with thesis Degree theory on Banach manifolds. Tromba was from 1968 to 1970 an assistant professor at Stanford University after which he joined the faculty of the University of California. From 1992-1995 he was Professor Ordinarius at the Ludwigs Maximilan University in Munich and is now currently distinguished professor at the University of California, Santa Cruz.

In 1975 he was a visiting scholar at the Institute for Advanced Study, in 1970 a visiting professor at the University of Pisa, and in 1974 a visiting professor at the University of Bonn and at SUNY. In 1975 he was a visiting professor at the University of Michigan, Ann Arbor and in 1986 he was an Invited Speaker of the ICM in Berkeley, California. In 1987 he led a research group at The Max Planck Institute in Bonn.

He is the author of eleven books. His book, Mathematics and Optimal Form was the first mathematics book in the Scientific American Library series. His text Vector Calculus (co-authored with Jerry Marsden) has been in print in six editions and five languages for 43 years

Tromba's research deals with the applications of global nonlinear analysis to partial differential equations, with Morse theory for problems in the calculus of variations, and with questions concerning the properties of minimal surfaces in flat space and in Riemannian manifolds.

== Selected publications ==
- Teichmüller theory in Riemannian Geometry, Birkhäuser 1992
- with L. Andersson and V. Moncrief: On the global evolution problem in 2+1 gravity, J. Geometry and Physics, vol. 23, 1997, pp. 191–205
- On a natural affine connection on the space of almost complex structures and the curvature of Teichmüller space with respect to its Weil-Petersson metric, Manuscripta Mathematica, vol. 56, 1996, pp. 475–497.
- On the number of simply connected minimal surfaces spanning a curve, Memoirs AMS, No. 194, 1977
- A general approach to Morse theory, Journal of Differential Geometry, vol. 12, 1977, pp. 47–85
- with Friedrich Tomi: Existence theorems for minimal surfaces of non-zero genus spanning a contour, Memoirs AMS, No. 382, 1988
- with F. Tomi: The index theorem for minimal surfaces of higher genus, Memoirs AMS, No. 560, 1995
- with Stefan Hildebrandt: Mathematics and optimal form. Scientific American Books, New York NY 1985, ISBN 0-7167-5009-0 (French translation: Mathématiques et formes optimales. L'explication des structures naturelles. Pour la Science, Paris 1986, ISBN 2-902918-49-6; German translation: Panoptimum, Mathematische Grundmuster des Vollkommenen (= Spektrum-Bibliothek. vol. 12). Spektrum der Wissenschaft, Heidelberg 1987, ISBN 3-922508-82-0).
- with Ulrich Dierkes and Stefan Hildebrandt: Global analysis of minimal surfaces, Springer Verlag 2010
- with Ulrich Dierkes and Stefan Hildebrandt: Regularity of Minimal Surfaces, Springer Verlag 2010
- with Kenneth McAloon: Calculus, Harcourt, Brace, Jovanovich 1972 (with the participation of Jerrold Marsden et al.)
- with Kenneth McAloon Calculus of one variable, Harcourt, Brace, Jovanovich 1972 (with the participation of Jerrold Marsden et al.)
- with Jerrold Marsden: Vector Calculus, Freeman, San Francisco, 6th edition 2012
- with Jerrold Marsden and Alan Weinstein: Basis multivariable calculus, Freeman 2000
- Theory of Branched Minimal Surfaces, Springer Verlag 2012
