= Jerrold E. Marsden =

Canadian mathematician (1942–2010)

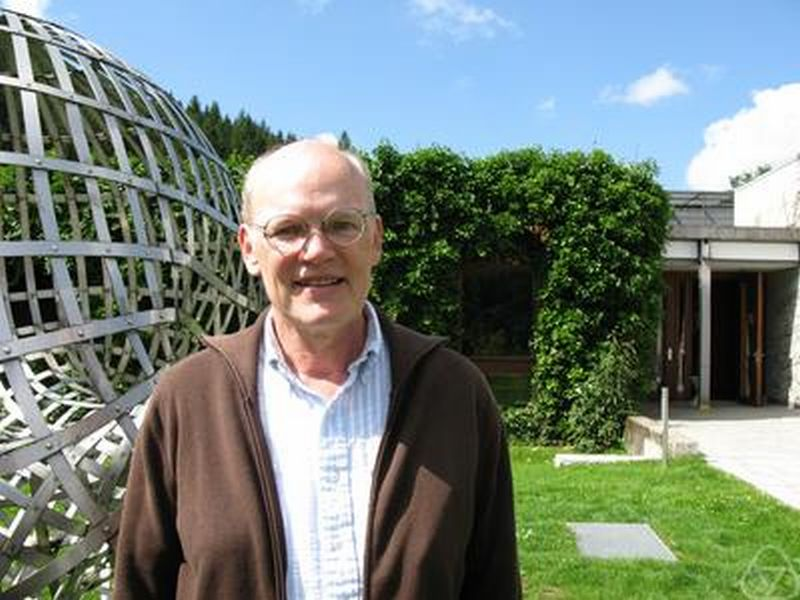
- Jerrold Marsden at Oberwolfach in 2008
- Born: August 17, 1942; Ocean Falls, British Columbia, Canada
- Died: September 21, 2010 (aged 68); Pasadena, California, United States
- Education: University of Toronto; Princeton University
- Known for: Classical mechanics
- Children: Alison Marsden; Christopher Marsden
- Scientific career
- Fields: Mathematics; Classical mechanics
- Workplaces: University of California, Berkeley; California Institute of Technology
- Doctoral advisor: Arthur Wightman
- Doctoral students: Graciela Chichilnisky; Tudor Ratiu

Jerrold Eldon Marsden (August 17, 1942 – September 21, 2010) was a Canadian mathematician. He was the Carl F. Braun professor of engineering, control and dynamical systems at the California Institute of Technology. Marsden is listed as an ISI highly cited researcher.

== Career ==
Marsden earned his B.Sc. in mathematics at the University of Toronto and his Ph.D. in mathematical physics at Princeton University in 1968 under Arthur S. Wightman. Thereafter, he worked at various universities and research institutes in the US, Canada, the United Kingdom, France and Germany. He was one of the founders of the Fields Institute in Toronto, Canada, and directed it until 1994. At the California Institute of Technology he was the Carl F. Braun professor of engineering, control and dynamical systems.

Marsden, together with Alan Weinstein, was one of the world leading authorities in mathematical and theoretical classical mechanics. He has laid much of the foundation for symplectic topology. The Marsden-Weinstein quotient is named after him.

In 1973, Marsden (along with Arthur E. Fischer) won the Gravitational Research Foundation Prize. He was also the recipient of a Carnegie Fellowship in 1977, and a Miller Professorship in 1981-82. Also in 1981, Marsden won the Jeffery–Williams Prize. And in 1990, he received the Norbert Wiener Prize in Applied Mathematics, jointly awarded by the Society for Industrial and Applied Mathematics (SIAM) and the American Mathematical Society. Marsden was honoured "for his outstanding contributions to the study of differential equations in mechanics: he proved the existence of chaos in specific classical differential equations; his work on the momentum map, from abstract foundations to detailed applications, has had great impact." He was also awarded the Max Planck Research Award for Mathematics and Computer science in 2000. In 2005, he won the prestigious John von Neumann Lecture, which is awarded by SIAM to recognize outstanding contributions to the field of applied mathematical sciences and for their effective communication to the community. In 2006 he was elected Fellow of the Royal Society. In the same year, he also received an honorary doctorate from the University of Surrey.

Marsden died of cancer on September 21, 2010. In 2006 a festschrift was published in honor of Marsden's 60th birthday. In 2015 a memorial volume was published in his honor.

== Books ==
- Jerrold E. Marsden and Alan Weinstein, Calculus Unlimited, Benjamin-Cummings (1981).
- J. E. Marsden and A. Weinstein, Calculus, I, II, III', 2nd ed., Springer-Verlag (1985).
- J. E. Marsden, A. Tromba, and A. Weinstein, Basic Multivariable Calculus, Springer-Verlag (1992).
- J. E. Marsden and A. Tromba, Vector Calculus, 5th ed., W. H. Freeman (2003).
- J. E. Marsden and M. Hoffman, Elementary Classical Analysis, 2nd ed., W. H. Freeman (1993)
- J. E. Marsden and M. Hoffman, Basic Complex Analysis, 3rd ed., W. H. Freeman (1998).
- Alexandre Chorin and Jerrold E. Marsden, A Mathematical Introduction to Fluid Mechanics, 3rd ed., Springer-Verlag (1993).
- J. E. Marsden, Applications of Global Analysis in Mathematical Physics, Mathematics Lecture Series, No. 2, Publish or Perish, Inc (1974).
- Jerrold E. Marsden and Thomas J.R. Hughes, A Short Course in Fluid Mechanics, Mathematics Lecture Series, No. 6, Publish or Perish, Inc (1976).
- J. E. Marsden and M. McCracken, The Hopf Bifurcation and Its Applications, Applied Mathematical Sciences, 19 Springer-Verlag (1976).
- Ralph Abraham and Jerrold E. Marsden, Foundations of Mechanics, The Mathematical Physics Monograph Series, 1st ed., W.A. Benjamin, Inc (1966).
- Ralph Abraham and Jerrold E. Marsden, Foundations of Mechanics, 2nd ed., Addison–Wesley (1987).
- Ralph Abraham, Jerrold E. Marsden, and Tudor S. Ratiu, Manifolds, Tensor Analysis, and Applications, Springer-Verlag (1988).
- J. E. Marsden, Lectures on Mechanics, Cambridge University Press (1992). 1st edition, 1989.
- Jerrold E. Marsden and Thomas J.R. Hughes, Mathematical Foundations of Elasticity, Prentice Hall (1983); Reprinted by Dover Publications (1994).
- J. E. Marsden and T. S. Ratiu, Introduction to Mechanics and Symmetry, Texts in Applied Mathematics, vol. 17, Springer-Verlag (1994).
- J. E. Marsden, G. Misiolek, J.-P. Ortega, M. Perlmutter, and T. S. Ratiu, Hamiltonian Reduction by Stages, Springer-Verlag (2007).
