= Alison Marsden =

Bioengineer

- Born: June 9, 1976 (age 50)
- Education: Princeton University; Stanford University
- Scientific career
- Fields: Cardiovascular biomechanics
- Doctoral advisor: Parviz Moin
- Website: https://cbcl.stanford.edu/ https://simvascular.github.io/

Alison Lesley Marsden is an American pediatric cardiologist and bioengineer. She is the Douglass M. and Nola Leishman Professor of cardiovascular disease in the departments of Pediatrics (Cardiology), Bioengineering, and, by courtesy, Mechanical Engineering at Stanford University. She is the daughter of Canadian-American mathematician Jerrold E. Marsden.

== Research ==
Marsden's research concerns the biomechanics of the cardiovascular system. It has included the development of accurate computer simulations of the Berlin Heart, an implantable artificial heart, with the aim of improving its design.

== Education and career ==
Marsden earned a bachelor's degree in mechanical engineering in 1998 from Princeton University. She did her graduate studies in mechanical engineering at Stanford University, earning a master's degree in 2000 and completing her Ph.D. in 2005.

After postdoctoral research in pediatric cardiology and bioengineering at Stanford, she taught at the University of California, San Diego from 2007 until 2015, when she returned to Stanford as a faculty member.

== Recognition ==
In 2018 Marsden became a fellow of the Society for Industrial and Applied Mathematics. She also became a fellow of the American Institute for Medical and Biological Engineering, "for fundamental contributions to cardiovascular simulation methodology, clinical translation of novel surgical designs, leadership in open-source software and gender diversity". In 2020 she was named a fellow of the American Physical Society "for the development of numerical methods for cardiovascular blood flow simulation and their application to cardiovascular surgery and congenital heart disease". She was elected a Fellow of the American Society of Mechanical Engineers in 2024.
