= Kato's inequality =

Inequality relating to the Laplace operator

In functional analysis, a subfield of mathematics, Kato's inequality is a distributional inequality for the Laplace operator or certain elliptic operators. It was proven in 1972 by the Japanese mathematician Tosio Kato.

The original inequality is for some degenerate elliptic operators. This article treats the special (but important) case for the Laplace operator.

== Inequality for the Laplace operator ==
Let $\Omega\subset \R^d$ be a bounded and open set, and $f\in L^1_{\operatorname{loc}}(\Omega)$ such that $\Delta f\in L^1_{\operatorname{loc}}(\Omega)$. Then the following holds

$\Delta |f| \geq \operatorname{Re}\left((\operatorname{sgn}\overline f) \Delta f\right)\quad$ in $\;\mathcal{D}'(\Omega)$,

where

$$\operatorname{sgn}\overline f=\begin{cases}\frac{\overline{f(x)}}{|f(x)|} & \text{if }f\neq 0\\
0 & \text{if }f=0.
\end{cases}$$

$L^1_{\operatorname{loc}}$ is the space of locally integrable functions – i.e., functions that are integrable on every compact subset of their domains of definition.

=== Remarks ===
- Sometimes the inequality is stated in the form

$\Delta f^+ \geq \operatorname{Re}\left(1_{[f\geq 0]} \Delta f\right)\quad$ in $\;\mathcal{D}'(\Omega)$

where $f^+=\operatorname{max}(f,0)$ and $1_{[f\geq 0]}$ is the indicator function.

- If $f$ is continuous in $\Omega$ then

$\Delta |f| \geq \operatorname{Re}\left((\operatorname{sgn}\overline f) \Delta f\right)\quad$ in $\;\mathcal{D}'(\{f\neq 0\})$.

== Literature ==
- Brezis, Haı̈m; Ponce, Augusto (2004). "Kato's inequality when Δu is a measure". Comptes Rendus Mathematique. 338 (8): 599–604. arXiv:1312.6498. doi:10.1016/j.crma.2003.12.032. hdl:2078.1/70476.
- Arendt, Wolfgang; ter Elst, Antonious F.M. (2019). "Kato's Inequality". Analysis and Operator Theory. Springer Optimization and Its Applications. Springer Optimization and Its Applications. Vol. 146. Cham: Springer. pp. 47–60. doi:10.1007/978-3-030-12661-2_3. ISBN 978-3-030-12660-5. S2CID 191796248.
