= Kato theorem =

Electron densities of Coulomb potentials have cusps at the nucleus

The Kato theorem, or Kato's cusp condition (after Japanese mathematician Tosio Kato), is used in computational quantum physics. It states that for generalized Coulomb potentials, the electron density, $n(\mathbf{r})$, has a cusp at the position of the nuclei, where it satisfies

$$Z_k = - \frac{a_o}{2n(\mathbf{r})} \frac{dn(\mathbf{r})}{dr} \Big| _{r \rightarrow \mathbf{R_k}}$$

Here $\mathbf{R_k}$ denotes the positions of the nuclei, $Z_k$ their atomic number and $a_o$ is the Bohr radius.

For a Coulombic system one can thus, in principle, read off all information necessary for completely specifying the Hamiltonian directly from examining the density distribution. This is also known as E. Bright Wilson's argument within the framework of density functional theory (DFT). The electron density of the ground state of a molecular system contains cusps at the location of the nuclei, and by identifying these from the total electron density of the system, the positions are thus established. From Kato's theorem, one also obtains the nuclear charge of the nuclei, and thus the external potential is fully defined. Finally, integrating the electron density over space gives the number of electrons, and the (electronic) Hamiltonian is defined. This is valid in a non-relativistic treatment within the Born–Oppenheimer approximation, and assuming point-like nuclei.
