= Tudor Ratiu =

Romanian-American mathematician (born 1950)

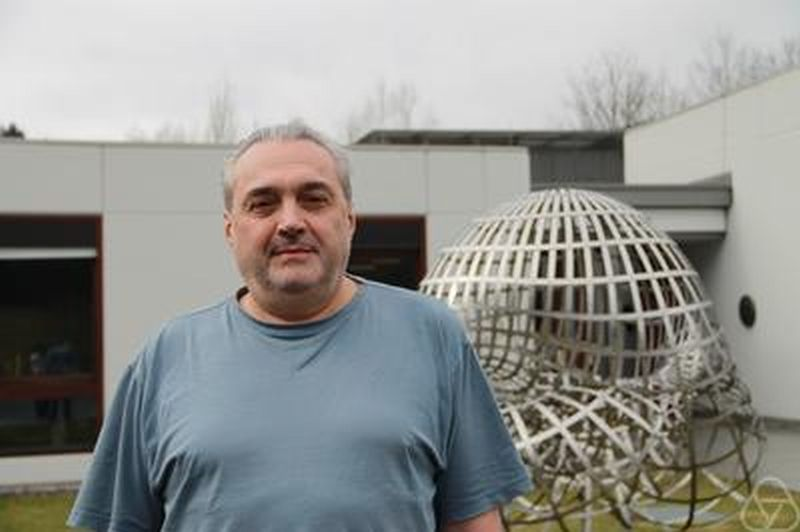
- Rațiu in 2013

Tudor Stefan Rațiu (born March 18, 1950) is a Romanian-American mathematician who has made contributions to geometric mechanics and dynamical systems theory.

== Education ==
Rațiu was born in Timișoara. His father, Mircea Rațiu, an engineer, was the younger brother of Ion Rațiu, a well-known Romanian politician, while his mother, Rodica Bucur, was a piano professor at the Conservatory of Music in Timișoara. Ratiu did his undergraduate studies at the Politehnica University of Timișoara, completing his B.Sc. in 1973 and his M.S. in 1974.

After moving to the United States, he completed his Ph.D. degree at the University of California, Berkeley in 1980; his dissertation, written under the supervision of Jerrold E. Marsden, was titled Euler-Poisson Equations on Lie Algebras.

== Career ==
From 1980 to 1983 Ratiu was a T. H. Hildebrandt Research Assistant Professor at the University of Michigan, after which he became an Associate Professor of Mathematics at the University of Arizona. In 1987 he moved to the University of California, Santa Cruz, where he became a Professor of Mathematics in 1988.

In 1998 Ratiu moved to the École Polytechnique Fédérale de Lausanne, where he was a professor until 2015. In 2014–15, he was a Professor of Mathematics at the Skolkovo Institute of Science and Technology in Russia. Since 2016 he is a professor at Shanghai Jiao Tong University in China.

Ratiu received a Sloan Research Fellowship in 1980, and he became a fellow of the American Mathematical Society in 2012. In 2003, he was awarded the Order of the Star of Romania, Commander rank.

== Publications ==
- Abraham, Ralph; Marsden, Jerrold E.; Ratiu, Tudor (1988). Manifolds, Tensor Analysis, and Applications. Applied Mathematical Sciences. Vol. 75. New York: Springer Science+Business Media. doi:10.1007/978-1-4612-1029-0. ISBN 978-0-387-96790-5. MR 0960687.
- Gay-Balmaz, François; Ratiu, Tudor; Tronci, Cesare (2013). "Equivalent theories of liquid crystal dynamics". Archive for Rational Mechanics and Analysis. 210 (3): 773–811. arXiv:1102.2918. Bibcode:2013ArRMA.210..773G. doi:10.1007/s00205-013-0673-1. MR 3116004. S2CID 14968950.
- Holm, Darryl D.; Marsden, Jerrold E.; Ratiu, Tudor (1998). "The Euler-Poincaré equations and semidirect products with applications to continuum theories". Advances in Mathematics. 137 (1): 1–81. arXiv:chao-dyn/9801015. doi:10.1006/aima.1998.1721. MR 1627802. S2CID 163598.
- Marsden, Jerrold E.; Ratiu, Tudor (1999). Introduction to mechanics and symmetry. A basic exposition of classical mechanical systems. Texts in Applied Mathematics. Vol. 17 (Second ed.). New York: Springer-Verlag. doi:10.1007/978-0-387-21792-5. ISBN 0-387-98643-X. MR 1723696.
- Ortega, Juan-Pablo; Ratiu, Tudor (2004). Momentum maps and Hamiltonian reduction. Progress in Mathematics. Vol. 222. Boston, MA: Birkhäuser. doi:10.1007/978-1-4757-3811-7. ISBN 0-8176-4307-9. MR 2021152.
