= Princeton Science Library =

Science book series written by scientists and published by Princeton University Press

The Princeton Science Library is a book series of popular science written by scientists known for their popular writings and originally published by Princeton University Press.

Books include:

- Flatland: A Romance of Many Dimensions by Edwin Abbott Abbott (1884)
- The Aim and Structure of Physical Theory by Pierre Maurice Marie Duhem (1914, English tr., 1954)
- The Meaning of Relativity: Including the Relativistic Theory of the Non-Symmetric Field by Albert Einstein (1922)
- The Causes of Evolution by J.B.S. Haldane (1932)
- How to Solve It: A New Aspect of Mathematical Method by George Polya (1945)
- The Mathematician's Mind: The Psychology of Invention in the Mathematical Field by Jacques Hadamard (1945)
- Symmetry by Hermann Weyl (1952)
- Eye and Brain by Richard L. Gregory (1966)
- The Enjoyment of Math by Hans Rademacher and Otto Toeplitz (1966)
- Adaptation and Natural Selection: A Critique of Some Current Evolutionary Thought by George Christopher Williams (1966)
- The New Science of Strong Materials or Why You Don't Fall Through the Floor by J. E. Gordon (1968)
- The Logic of Life: A History of Heredity by François Jacob (1976)
- Why Big Fierce Animals Are Rare: An Ecologist's Perspective by Paul A. Colinvaux (1978)
- Hands by John R. Napier (1980), edited by Russell H. Tuttle (1993)
- The Laws of the Game: How the principles of nature govern chance by Manfred Eigen and Ruthild Winkler (1981)
- Infinity and the Mind: The Science and Philosophy of the Infinite by Rudy Rucker (1982)
- The Evolution of Culture in Animals by John Tyler Bonner (1983)
- Neuronal Man by Jean-Pierre Changeux (1983)
- QED: The Strange Theory of Light and Matter by Richard P. Feynman (1985)
- Time Frames: The Evolution of Punctuated Equilibria by Niles Eldredge (1985)
- Fearful Symmetry: The Search for Beauty in Modern Physics by Anthony Zee (1986 1st ed) (1997 2nd ed)
- A View of the Sea: A Discussion between a Chief Engineer and an Oceanographer about the Machinery of the Ocean Circulation by Henry M. Stommel (1987)
- Encounters with Einstein: And Other Essays on People, Places, and Particles by Werner Heisenberg (1989)
- The Quantum World by John C. Polkinghorne (1989)
- Atom and Void: Essays on Science and Community by J. Robert Oppenheimer (1989)
- Chance and Chaos by David Ruelle (1991)
- The Miner's Canary: Extinctions Past and Present by Niles Eldredge (1991)
- Liquid Crystals: Nature's Delicate Phase of Matter by Peter J. Collings (1991)
- Fractals: Endlessly Repeated Geometrical Figures by Hans Lauwerier (1991)
- 100 Billion Suns: The Birth Life and Death of the Stars by Rudolf Kippenhahn (1993)
- "e": The Story of a Number by Eli Maor (1994)
- Designing the Molecular World: Chemistry at the Frontier by Philip Ball (1994)
- The Supernova Story by Laurence Marschall (1994)
- The Garden in the Machine: The Emerging Science of Artificial Life by Claus Emmeche (1994)
- A Natural History of Shells by Geerat J. Vermeij (1995)
- Total Eclipses of the Sun by Jack B. Zirker (1995)
- The Nature of Space and Time by Stephen W. Hawking and Roger Penrose (1996)
- Celestial Encounters: The Origins of Chaos and Stability by Florin Diacu and Philip Holmes (1996)
- A Guide to Fossils by Helmut Mayr (1996)
- T. Rex and the Crater of Doom by Walter Alvarez (1997)
- How the Leopard Changed Its Spots: The Evolution of Complexity by Brian Goodwin (1997)
- An Imaginary Tale: The Story of $\sqrt{-1}$ by Paul J. Nahin (1998)
- ecology and evolution of Darwin's finches by Peter R. Grant (1999)
- Trigonometric Delights by Eli Maor (2002)
- The Extravagant Universe: Exploding Stars, Dark Energy, and the Accelerating Cosmos by Robert P. Kirshner (2002)
- Gamma: Exploring Euler's Constant by Julian Havil (2003)
- Journey from the Center of the Sun by Jack B. Zirker (2004)
- Life on a Young Planet: The First Three Billion Years of Evolution on Earth by Andrew H. Knoll (2004)
- Plows, Plagues and Petroleum: How Humans Took Control of Climate by William F. Ruddiman (2005)
- Primates and Philosophers: How Morality Evolved by Frans de Waal (2006)
- The Pythagorean Theorem: A 4,000-Year History by Eli Maor (2007)
- Dr. Euler's Fabulous Formula: Cures Many Mathematical Ills by Paul J. Nahin (2011)
