= Graciela Chichilnisky =

Argentine-American economist (born 1946)

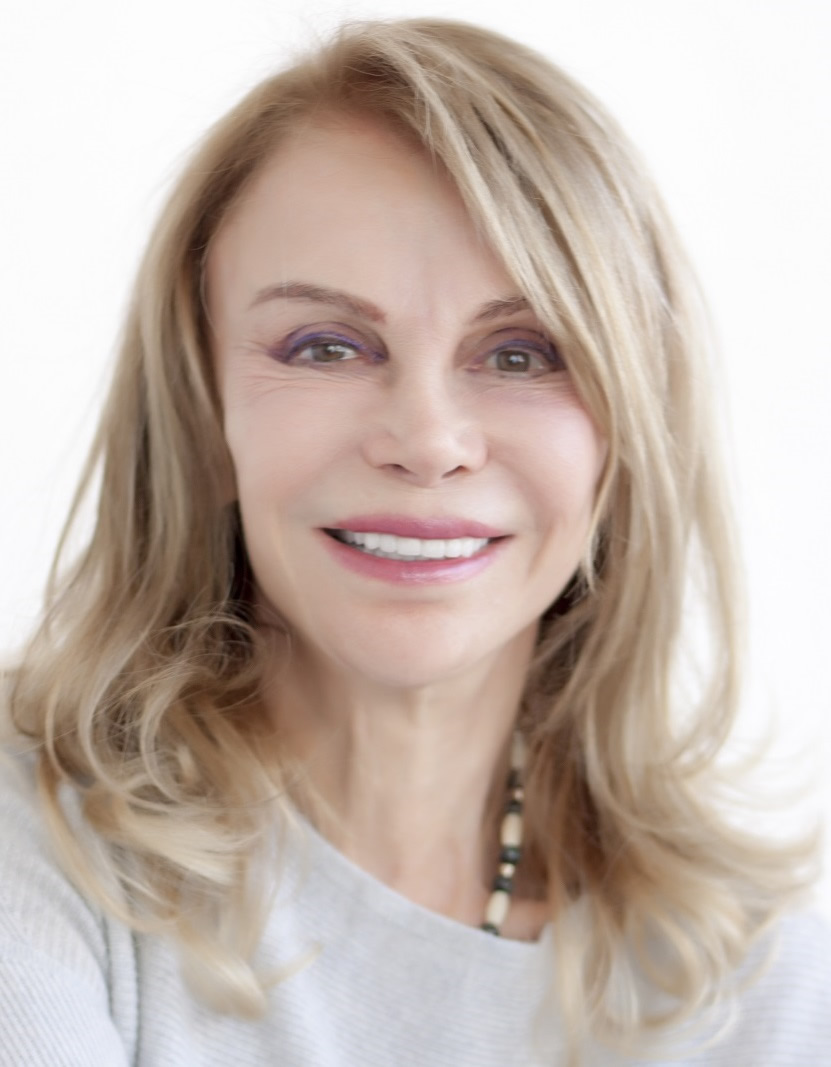
- Born: March 27, 1946 (age 80); Buenos Aires, Argentina
- Citizenship: United States
- Children: 2, including E.J.

Academic background
- Education: Massachusetts Institute of Technology; University of California, Berkeley (MA, PhD, PhD)
- Doctoral advisor: Jerrold Marsden (PhD in mathematics); Gerard Debreu (PhD in economics)
- Website: chichilnisky.com

Graciela Chichilnisky (born March 27, 1946) is an Argentine-American economist known for her work in economics and climate change. A professor of economics and statistics at Columbia University and visiting professor to Stanford University, her economic research is marked by the application of mathematics and topology, as well as research in international and development economics. She is also co-founder of the direct-air capture company Global Thermostat, and was its CEO from its founding in 2010 until she stepped down in 2022.

== Personal life and education ==
Graciela Chichilnisky was born c. March 27, 1946 in Buenos Aires, the daughter of Russian Jewish immigrants. Her father was a professor of neurology at the University of Buenos Aires and a friend of Juan Perón. Chichilnisky received high school education at the Instituto Nacional de Lenguas Vivas, additionally taking science classes at the local university. After a coup, the military closed the University of Buenos Aires, and professor Warren Ambrose fled to the Massachusetts Institute of Technology (MIT), taking six students—including Chichilnisky—with him. Chichilnisky's son E.J. Chichilnisky was born while Graciela was in high school, and she was raising him as a single mother at the time of her move to MIT.

Chichilnisky, who had no formal undergraduate education, was accepted to MIT, and matriculated into the doctoral program in mathematics with support from a Ford Foundation scholarship. While in the doctoral program, she was advised by Norman Levinson. She studied at MIT from 1967 to 1968, then transferred to the University of California, Berkeley. In 1970 she received a Master of Arts degree, the following year receiving a Doctor of Philosophy (Ph.D.) degree in mathematics under the advisor Jerrold Marsden. In 1976, she received another Ph.D. from Berkeley, this one in economics, under Nobel laureate Gerard Debreu. Some sources erroneously state that she received a degree from MIT, but this is incorrect, all of her degrees were awarded by Berkeley. Chichilnisky's daughter Natasha was born in 1987 to Graciela and Geoffrey Heal, a fellow professor at Columbia. Natasha died in 2014 while a graduate student at Yale University.

Since c. 1991–1992, Chichilnisky has been a naturalized American citizen. In 2017, the Carnegie Corporation of New York recognized her as one of 38 "Great Immigrants", a distinction honoring naturalized citizens for contributions to their field. She has two children, lives in New York City, and speaks English, Spanish, and French.

== Career ==
After a postdoctoral position at Harvard University, Chichilnisky accepted a position as an associate professor of economics at Columbia University in 1977, and received tenure and a promotion to professor in two years. She was named UNESCO Professor of Mathematics and Economics from 1995 to 2008, part of the UNESCO Chairs program. She also held a chair in economics at the University of Essex from 1980 to 1981, and has additionally been a visiting professor at other universities, including at the Institute for Economic Policy Research at Stanford University since 2015.

In 2010, Chichilnisky, along with co-founder Peter Eisenberger and supporter Ben Bronfman, formed Global Thermostat, a company specializing in direct-air capture. She was the company's CEO, and in 2015, was named CEO of the Year in Sustainability by the business magazine International Alternative Investment Review. Corporate restructuring in 2022 led her to step down from her role as CEO. As of 2023, Chichilnisky is CEO of GT Climate Innovation.

== Research ==
Chichilnisky is the author of over 17 books and over 330 scientific research papers. She is best known for designing the carbon market outlined in the Kyoto Protocol, which has been international law since 2005. She was also a lead author on the 2007 Intergovernmental Panel on Climate Change report, which won that year's Nobel Peace Prize.

In the theory of international trade, she constructed an example of a "transfer paradox", where a transfer of goods from a donor to a recipient can render the recipient worse off and the donor better off. She constructed examples where export-led growth strategies for developing countries could result in paradoxically poor results, because of increasing returns to scale in the technologies of the developed countries.

In welfare economics and voting theory, particularly in the specialty of social choice theory, Chichilnisky introduced a continuous model of collective decisions to which she applied algebraic topology; following her initiatives, continuous social choice has developed as an international subdiscipline. During the 1980s and 1990s some of Chichilnisky's research was done in collaboration with mathematical economist Geoffrey M. Heal, who has been her colleague at Essex and Columbia.

A list of Chichilnisky's publications can be found on her CV, which is linked from her profile on the Columbia Economics website. Independent articles discussing and reviewing her work have also been published in peer-reviewed journals.

== Litigation ==
In 1994, Chichilnisky sued two other economics professors, accusing them of stealing her ideas. Chichilnisky was countersued, and both lawsuits were later dropped. Although there were high tensions within the field, the subject matter of the controversy was described in news reports as "distinctly small-time stuff, at least according to most experts." In 1991 and 2000, Chichilnisky sued her employer, Columbia University. The first lawsuit, which settled for $500,000 in 1995, alleged that the university unfairly paid her 30% less than male coworkers. She filed a lawsuit again in 2000, alleging that the university continued to display sexism, had retaliated against her for the previous suit, and was attempting to dissolve her endowed chair. Columbia countersued in 2003, but Chichilnisky settled the case in 2008 and received $200,000; the university did not admit any wrongdoing. Columbia University maintains that she has a difficult time working with colleagues and is abrasive in nature, while Chichilnisky holds that these traits would not be pointed out if she were male.
