= The Trouble with Atheism =

British documentary television programme (2006)

The Trouble with Atheism is an hour-long documentary on atheism, presented by Rod Liddle. It was broadcast on Channel 4 in Britain in December 2006. The documentary focuses on criticising atheism for its perceived similarities to religion, as well as arrogance and intolerance. The programme includes interviews with a number of prominent scientists, including atheists Richard Dawkins and Peter Atkins and Anglican priest John Polkinghorne. It also includes an interview with Ellen Johnson, the president of American Atheists.

== Overview ==
Liddle begins the documentary by attempting to survey common criticisms of religion, and particularly antireligious arguments based on the prevalence of religious violence. He argues that the "very stupid human craving for certainty and justification", not religion, is to blame for this violence, and that atheism is becoming just as dogmatic as religion.

In order to support his thesis, Liddle presents numerous examples of actions and words by atheists which he argues are direct parallels of religious attitudes. He characterizes Atkins and Dawkins as "fundamentalist atheists" and "evangelists". In response to atheistic appeals to science as a superior method for understanding the world than religion, Liddle argues that science itself is akin to religion: "the problem for atheists is that science may not be as far away from religion as you might imagine". He describes Fermilab, a U.S. Department of Energy National Laboratory focused on particle physics, as a "temple to science", and characterises Charles Darwin's On the Origin of Species as a "sacred text" for atheists.

Liddle focuses on objections to evolution halfway through the documentary, on the premise that "Darwinism is atheism's trump card". He characterises the creation–evolution controversy as being between scientists "who see no room for religion in the world" and ones "who can accommodate both a scientific and religious worldview". Liddle interviews the intelligent design supporter Steve Fuller, a philosopher, who argues that evolution is the only "scientifically credible basis" for atheism, and anthropologist Jeffrey H. Schwartz, who argues that evolutionary theory cannot account for novelties. He comes to the conclusion that the modern synthetic theory of evolution will be superseded in a future paradigm shift, undermining the arguments of atheists like Dawkins. Liddle also criticizes models of sociocultural evolution such as memetics and interviews skeptics of memetics such as Alister McGrath.

In the final part of the documentary, Liddle argues against a perceived overreliance on "cold logic" and the amoral scientific method. He focuses primarily on the track record of secular ethics, citing the role of the Jacobins and Cult of Reason in the Reign of Terror in Revolutionary France, as well as the religious persecution under Soviet state atheism. He also criticizes evolutionary theory, as well as scientism, for Francis Galton's philosophy of eugenics and its influence on Nazi Germany's racial policies, speaking of a "direct line between Darwin, Galton, and Hitler". Further, Liddle criticizes the ethics of Dawkins and atheist philosopher Peter Singer as "tentative" and "wishy-washy".

Ultimately, Liddle argues that "which option you take, then, God or no God, is a matter of choosing something for which there is no scientific proof either way". He argues that adhering to both religious supernaturalism and scientific naturalism is not contradictory, but a "balance" of the "very essence of what it is to be human". Based on arguments for God such as the fine-tuned universe argument, and on a lack of a conclusive understanding of pre-Big Bang physics, Liddle states that "the true scientific position, of course, is that there may be a God, and there may not be a God". Liddle identifies this position as agnostic, which he distinguishes from the "zealous" atheism he is critical of.

== Reviews ==
The Guardian called the programme "fascinating", but criticised it by saying "Secular societies, of course, can be very brutal, but they weren't actually killing in the name of their non-belief, were they?". The Times objected to the brevity of his arguments, stating that, while some opponents of religion made a poor impression, "a more sustained debate would have made this a more rigorously argumentative programme".

== See also ==
- The Root of All Evil?
