= John Terborgh =

American biologist (born 1936)

John W. Terborgh
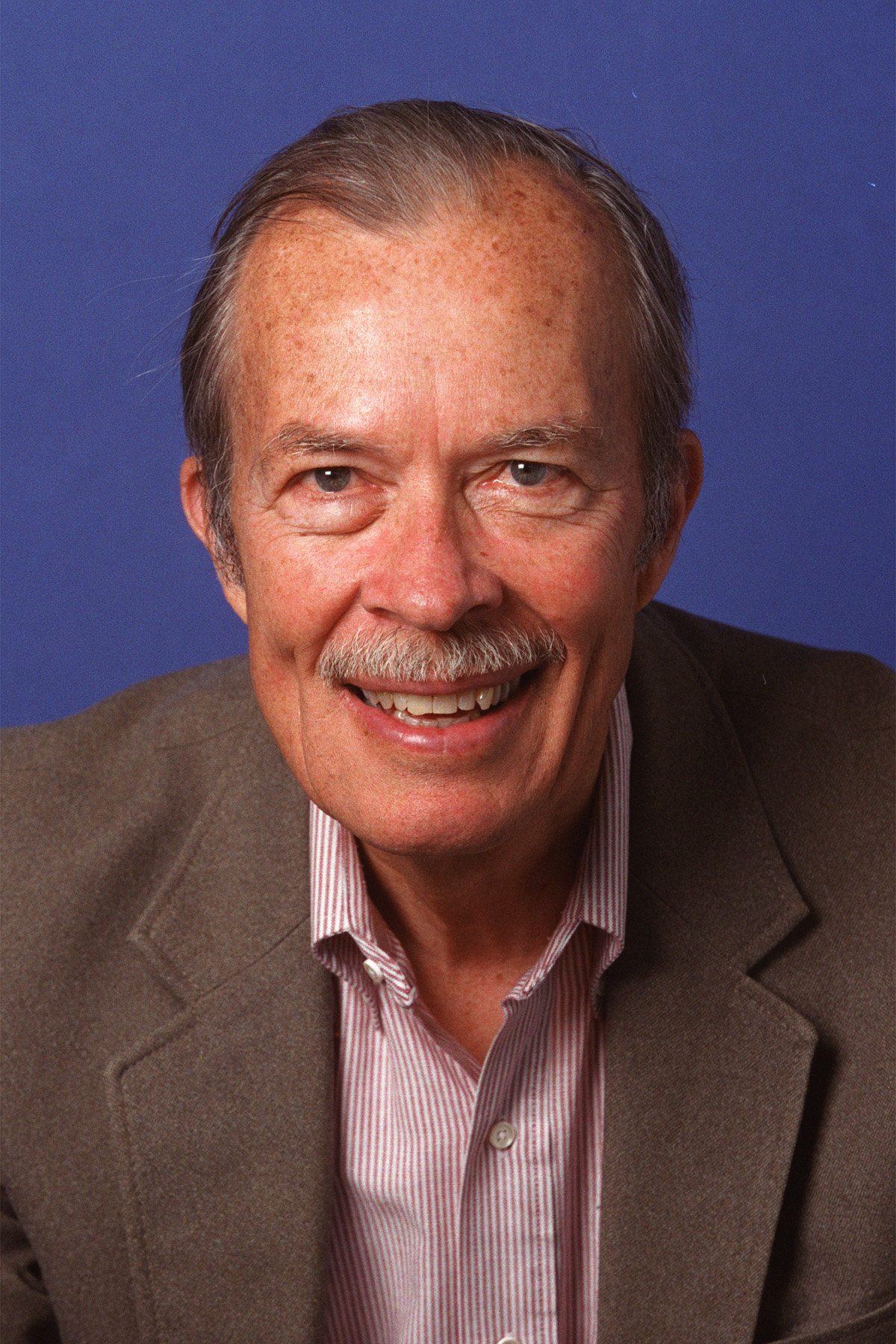
- Born: 1936 (age 89–90); Washington, D.C.
- Education: Harvard College (AB 1958); Harvard University (PhD 1963)
- Awards: MacArthur Fellowship (1992); Daniel Giraud Elliot Medal (1996)
- Scientific career
- Fields: Conservation biology
- Institutions: Duke University; Princeton University

Signature
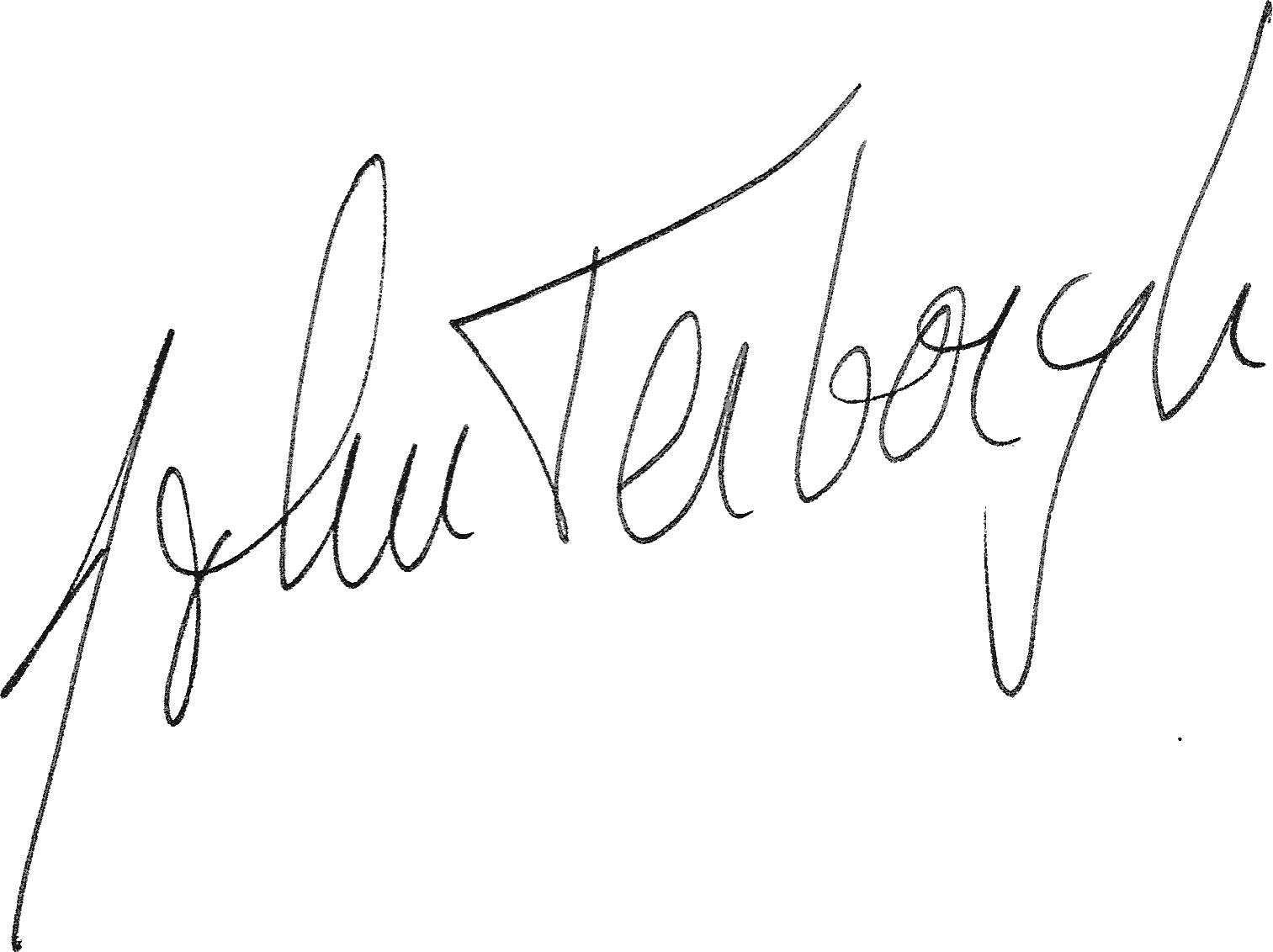

John Whittle Terborgh (born April 16, 1936) is a James B. Duke Professor of Environmental Science at Duke University and co-director of the Center for Tropical Conservation. He is a member of the National Academy of Sciences, and for the past thirty-five years, has been actively involved in tropical ecology and conservation issues. An authority on avian and mammalian ecology in Neotropical forests, Terborgh has published numerous articles and books on conservation themes. Since 1973, he has operated the Cocha Cashu Biological Station, a tropical ecology research station in Manú National Park, Peru.

== Research career ==
Raised in Arlington, Virginia, Terborgh graduated from Harvard College in 1958 and received his PhD in plant physiology from Harvard University in 1963. He served on the faculty of the University of Maryland and then, for 18 years, on the faculty of Princeton University. In 1989, Terborgh moved to Duke University, where he joined the faculty of the (now) Nicholas School of the Environment and founded the Duke University Center for Tropical Conservation.

One of the defining features of Terborgh's research is field work in relatively difficult to access tropical regions. Terborgh studied the elevational distributions of tropical birds in New Guinea with college classmate and friend Jared Diamond, and in Peru. Terborgh's study of how competition limits bird ranges involved surveying the Cerros del Sira, "a corner of the world so remote that one must travel a full week to obtain even the most trivial supplies". The Acknowledgements of this paper state "[Terborgh]'s life was saved in a grueling ordeal of emergency by the extraordinary exertions of several unnamed Campa Indians and four Peruvian assistants...".

He has served on several boards and advisory committees related to conservation, including the Wildlands Project, Cultural Survival, The Nature Conservancy, The World Wildlife Fund and both the Primate and Ecology Specialist Groups of the International Union for Conservation of Nature.

Terborgh and his work were among several featured in the documentary film, The Serengeti Rules, which was released in 2018.

== Major scientific contributions ==
Terborgh's biography for the MacArthur award states:

"Terborgh pioneered the field use of experimental analysis techniques in his early work on the altitudinal distribution of neotropical birds and on the role of competition in bird community structure."

This work, along with that of Jared Diamond, highlighted the importance of competition in governing the elevational distributions of tropical birds, in contrast to competing ideas at the time that these distributions were largely governed by bird's climate tolerance.

Terborgh's work has also highlighted the importance of predators in keeping herbivores in check, thus allowing plants to thrive (known as the 'Green Earth' hypothesis).

== Awards and honours ==
In June 1992, Terborgh was awarded a MacArthur Fellowship in recognition of his distinguished work in tropical ecology, and in April 1996 he was awarded the Daniel Giraud Elliot Medal from The National Academy of Sciences for his research, and for his book Diversity and the Tropical Rainforest. In 2005, he was elected Honorary Fellow of the Association for Tropical Biology and Conservation during the organization's annual meeting held in Uberlândia, Brazil.

== Publications ==
Terborgh is the author of hundreds of scientific papers and popular essays, and author or editor of several books:

- Requiem for Nature. Island Press. 2004. p. 256. ISBN 1-55963-588-6.
- Making parks work: strategies for preserving tropical nature. Island Press. 2002. p. 511. ISBN 1-55963-905-9.
- Diversity and the Tropical Rain Forest. Scientific American Library. 1992. p. 242. ISBN 0-7167-5030-9.
- Where Have All the Birds Gone? Essays on the Biology and Conservation of Birds That Migrate to the American Tropics. Princeton University Press. 1989. p. 224. ISBN 0-691-02428-6.
- Five New World Primates: A Study in Comparative Ecology. Princeton University Press. 1983. p. 260. ISBN 0-691-08338-X.
