= David Broomhead =

British mathematician (1950–2014)

Dave Broomhead
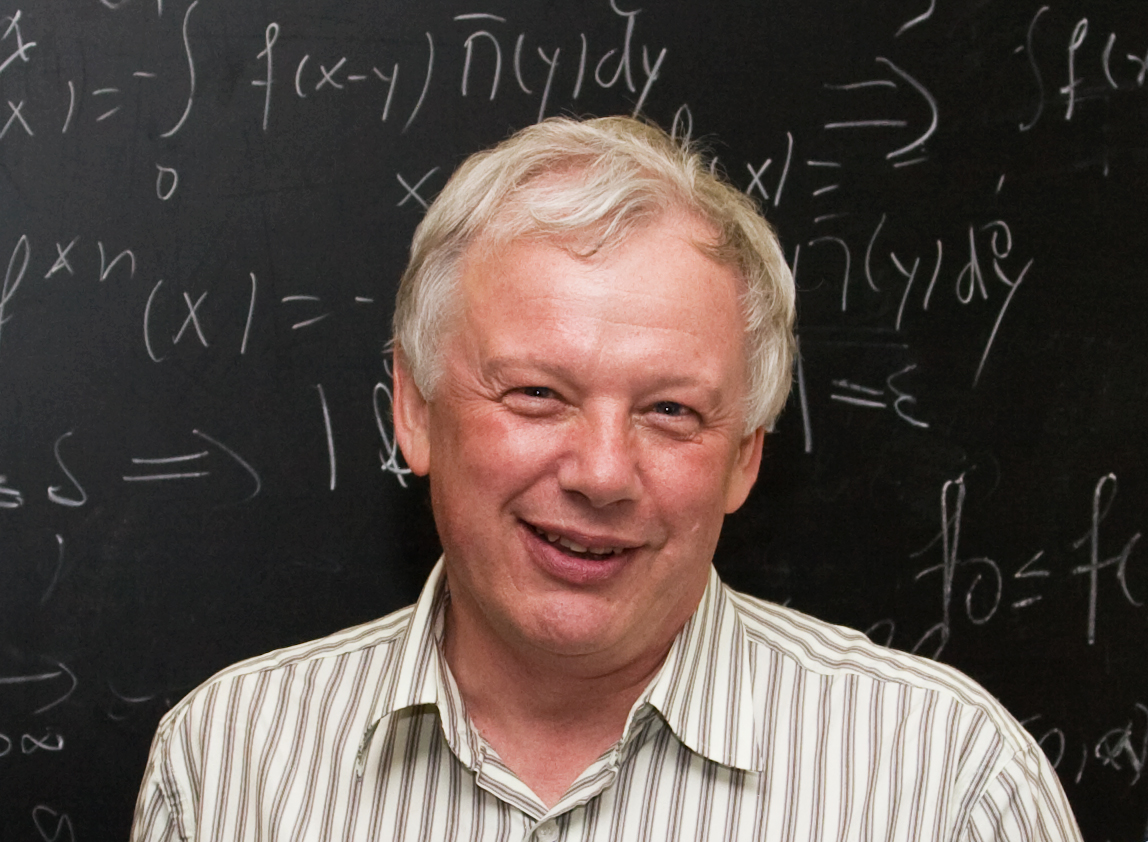
- Broomhead in 2008
- Born: David S. Broomhead; 13 November 1950; Leeds, United Kingdom
- Died: 24 July 2014 (aged 63); London, United Kingdom
- Education: University of Oxford
- Scientific career
- Fields: Mathematics
- Workplaces: AERE; University of Kyoto; University of Warwick; RSRE; UMIST; University of Manchester
- Thesis: Molecules in Electromagnetic Fields (1976)
- Doctoral advisor: Peter Atkins
- Website: www.maths.manchester.ac.uk/~dsb/

David S. Broomhead (13 November 1950 – 24 July 2014) was a British mathematician specialising in dynamical systems and was professor of applied mathematics at the School of Mathematics, University of Manchester.

== Education ==
Broomhead was born on 13 November 1950 in Leeds. He attended Aireborough Grammar School and, after spending a year teaching in Uganda, Broomhead moved to Merton College, Oxford, where he read chemistry for his first degree. He remained in Oxford for his D.Phil., researching quantum mechanics under the supervision of Peter Atkins. He completed his thesis Molecules in Electromagnetic Fields in 1976.

== Career ==
After a year as a postdoc at the Atomic Energy Research Establishment, Broomhead moved to Japan. He held at two-year NATO Postdoctoral Fellowship in the Department of Physics at the University of Kyoto, in K. Tomita's group. On returning to the U.K., he worked as a postdoc with George Rowlands at the University of Warwick, again in the Physics Department. In 1983, Broomhead began working in the Signal Processing group at the Royal Signals and Radar Establishment (RSRE, now QinetiQ) in Malvern, becoming Senior Principal Scientific Officer. In 1995 he moved to Manchester, taking a Chair in Applied Mathematics, initially at UMIST and then after 2004, at the School of Mathematics at the new University of Manchester.

From 1989 to 1992 he was Coordinator of the EPSRC Nonlinear Mathematics Initiative. He held visiting positions at University College London, the University of Oxford and Hiroshima University. Broomhead was a Fellow of the Institute of Mathematics and its Applications (IMA), a member of the IMA Council from 1998 and was Chair of the Editorial Board of Mathematics Today from 2002. In 2013 he was made an Honorary Fellow of the IMA.

== Research ==
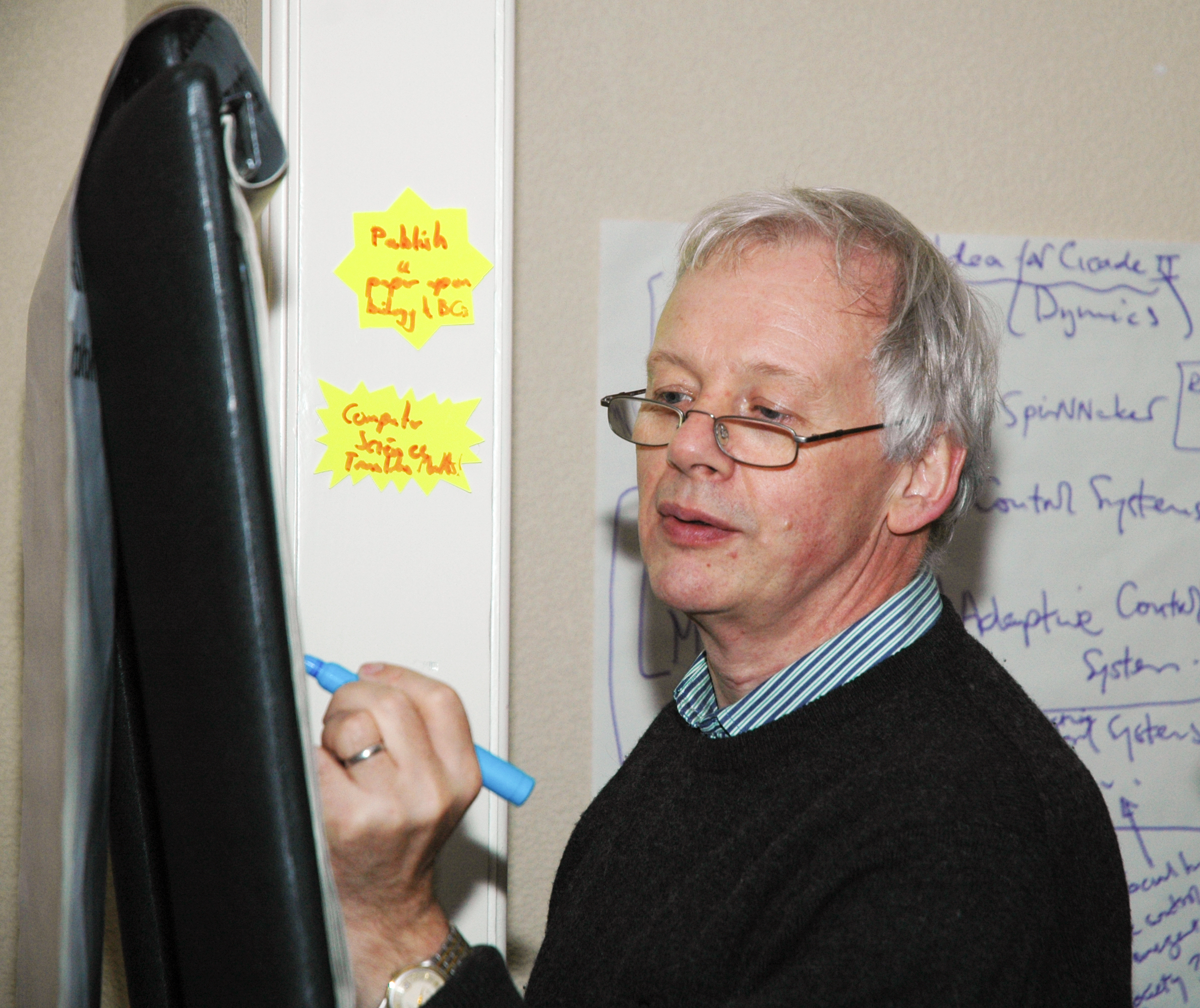
Broomhead in 2010

Broomhead's main interest was the development of methods for time series analysis and nonlinear signal processing using techniques from the theory of nonlinear dynamical systems. He also championed applying these ideas in interdisciplinary research.

In Japan, Broomhead began to work seriously on applied nonlinear dynamics and chaos. With Greg King he developed techniques to determine whether an experimental time series had been generated by a deterministic chaotic system by combining the pure mathematical results on topological embedding due to Takens with the engineering method of singular value decompositions.

While in Malvern, Broomhead wrote his influential papers on delay embedding and on neural networks. In 1989 he was awarded the John Benjamin Memorial Prize for work with David Lowe and Andrew Webb that exploited an analogy between neural networks and interpolation using the newly developed radial basis functions from numerical analysis.

At Manchester he became increasingly interested in applications to biology. He worked initially on eye movement control with Richard Abadi. Later, as a member of the Manchester Centre for Integrative Systems Biology, he worked with Douglas Kell on large-scale models of metabolism, and with Mike White on the dynamics of intracellular signalling cascades. He also developed a deep interest in hybrid systems and asynchronous processes, founding the Centre for Interdisciplinary Computational and Dynamical Analysis (CICADA).

== Personal life ==
Broomhead met his wife Eleanor at Merton College, and they had one son, Nathan.

He died suddenly on 24 July 2014 at the National Hospital in London.
