= Hermann Flaschka =

Austrian physicist and mathematician (1945–2021)

- Born: March 25, 1945; Öblarn, Austria
- Died: March 18, 2021 (aged 75); Tucson, Arizona
- Education: Massachusetts Institute of Technology
- Awards: Norbert Wiener Prize
- Scientific career
- Fields: Mathematics, Mathematical physics
- Workplaces: University of Arizona
- Doctoral advisor: Gilbert Strang

Hermann Flaschka (25 March 1945 – 18 March 2021) was an Austrian-American mathematical physicist and Professor of Mathematics at the University of Arizona, known for his important contributions in completely integrable systems (soliton equations).

== Childhood ==
Flaschka had lived in the USA since his family immigrated when he was a teenager. They lived in Atlanta, GA. His father Hermenegild Arved Flaschka (1915 - 1999) taught Chemistry at Georgia Tech. Hermann graduated from Druid Hills High School with the class of 1962 and received his Bachelor's degree at Georgia Tech in 1967. Among other achievements there he also received the "William Gilmer Perry Awards for Freshman English" in 1963, despite the fact that he's not a native speaker.

== Career ==
He received his Ph.D. from the Massachusetts Institute of Technology in 1970. His advisor was Gilbert Strang and the title of his thesis Asymptotic Expansions and Hyperbolic Equations with Multiple Characteristics. He then worked as post-doc at the Carnegie Mellon University until 1972. He was a professor at the University of Arizona until his retirement in 2017.

He lectured as visiting professor at several institutions, among them the Clarkson University (1978/79), the Kyoto RIMS (1980/81) and the École Polytechnique Fédérale de Lausanne (2002).

In 1995 he received the Norbert Wiener Prize in Applied Mathematics. In 2012 he became a fellow of the American Mathematical Society.

== Work ==
He made important contributions to the theory of completely integrable systems in particular the Toda lattice and the Korteweg–de Vries equation.

In 1980 he co-founded Physica D: Nonlinear Phenomena for which he also served as co-editor for many years. Publisher Elsevier now lists him as honorary editor.
