= Arthur Winfree =

American theoretical biologist (1942–2002)

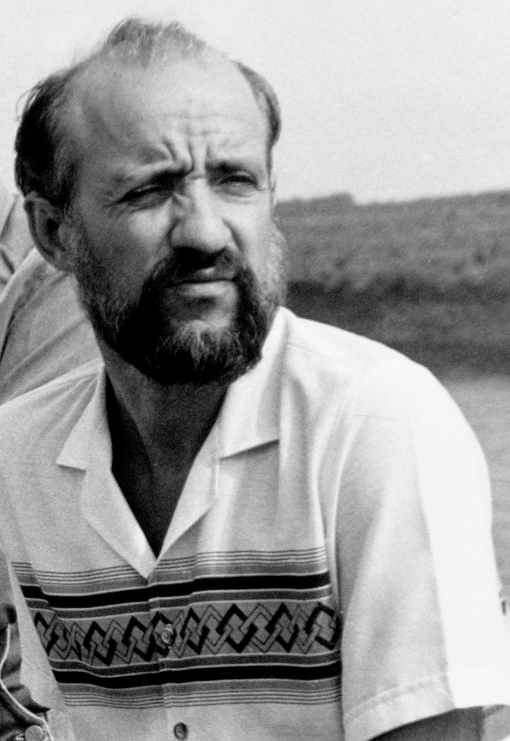
- Arthur Winfree in 1983
- Born: May 15, 1942; St. Petersburg, Florida, United States
- Died: November 5, 2002 (aged 60)
- Awards: Norbert Wiener Prize in Applied Mathematics
- Scientific career
- Fields: Theoretical Biology
- Workplaces: University of Arizona

Arthur Taylor Winfree (May 15, 1942 – November 5, 2002) was a theoretical biologist at the University of Arizona. He was born in St. Petersburg, Florida, United States.

Winfree was noted for his work on the mathematical modeling of biological phenomena (see Complexity and Singularity (system theory)): from cardiac arrhythmia and circadian rhythms to the self-organization of slime mold colonies and the Belousov–Zhabotinsky reaction. Winfree was a MacArthur Fellow from 1984 to 1989, he won the Einthoven Prize for his work on ventricular fibrillation, and shared the 2000 Norbert Wiener Prize in Applied Mathematics with Alexandre Chorin.

He was the father of Erik Winfree, another MacArthur Fellow and currently a professor at the California Institute of Technology, and Rachael Winfree, currently a professor in the Department of Ecology, Evolution and Natural Resources at Rutgers University.

The Arthur T. Winfree Prize was established by the Society for Mathematical Biology in his honor.

== Career ==
=== Professorial history ===
- 1965 Bachelor of Engineering Physics, Cornell University
- 1970 Ph.D. in biology, Princeton University
- 1969–1972 Assistant professor, University of Chicago
- 1972–1979 Associate professor of biological sciences, Purdue University
- 1979–1986 Professor of biological sciences, Purdue University
- 1986–2002 Professor of ecology and evolutionary biology, University of Arizona
- 1989–2002 Regents Professor, University of Arizona

=== Awards and honors ===
Awards
| Year | Award |
|---|---|
| 1961 | Westinghouse Science Talent Search Finalist |
| 1982 | John Simon Guggenheim Memorial Fellowship |
| 1984 | John D. and Catherine T. MacArthur Prize |
| 1989 | The Einthoven Award (Netherlands Royal Academy of Science, InterUniversity Cardiology Institute, and Einthoven Foundation) |
| 2000 | AMS-SIAM Norbert Wiener Prize in Applied Mathematics, "in recognition of his profound impact on the field of biological rhythms, otherwise known as coupled nonlinear oscillators" (shared with A. Chorin) |
| 2001 | Aisenstadt Chair Lecturer (Centre de Recherche Mathématiques, Université de Montréal) |

== Publications ==
- Arthur T. Winfree (2001). The Geometry of Biological Time. Springer-Verlag. ISBN 0-387-98992-7. (Second edition, first edition published 1980).
- Arthur T. Winfree (1987). When Time Breaks Down: The Three-Dimensional Dynamics of Electrochemical Waves and Cardiac Arrhythmias. Princeton University Press. ISBN 0-691-02402-2.
- Arthur T. Winfree (1987). Timing of Biological Clocks. Scientific American Library, No 19. ISBN 0-7167-5018-X.
- Editorial (2004). Arthur T. Winfree (1942–2002). Journal of Theoretical Biology, No 230. pp. 433–439.
