= Robert Krasny =

- Education: University of California, Berkeley (Ph.D.)
- Scientific career
- Fields: Mathematics
- Workplaces: University of Michigan
- Thesis: A Numerical Study of Kelvin-Helmholtz Instability by the Point Vortex Method (1983)
- Doctoral advisor: Alexandre Chorin

Robert Krasny is a professor in the Mathematics department at University of Michigan. He was awarded the status of Fellow in the American Physical Society, after he was nominated by his Division of Fluid Dynamics in 2007, for "his many achievements in advancing particle methods and tree-code algorithms to allow exceptionally precise computations of vortex dynamics, and his insightful use of the resulting methods to increase the fundamental understanding of regular and chaotic phenomena in fluid flows." In 2012 he became one of the inaugural fellows of the American Mathematical Society.

== See also ==
- List of fellows of the American Physical Society (1998–2010)
