= University Professorship (University of California) =

The title of University Professor at the University of California is "reserved for scholars of international distinction who are recognized and respected as teachers of exceptional ability . Unlike Distinguished Professorships, which are campus specific, recommendations for the appointment of a University Professor at the University of California are made by the President of the University of California, and all such appointments must be confirmed by the Regents of the University of California. Since 1960, and as of June 28, 2018, there have been 40 faculty given the title of University Professor.

== See also ==
- Distinguished Professor
