= Geoffrey M. Heal =

British-American economist

- Born: Bangor, Wales

Academic background
- Education: Churchill College, Cambridge (BA, MA, PhD)

Academic work
- Discipline: Economics
- Institutions: University of Sussex; University of Essex; Columbia University
- Main interests: Environmental economics
- Website: https://ideas.repec.org/e/phe40.html

Geoffrey M. Heal is a British-American economist known for his work on environmental and resource economics. He is the Donald C. Waite III Professor of Social Enterprise at Columbia Business School.

== Biography ==
Heal was born in 1944 in Bangor, Wales. He received his bachelor's, master's, and doctorate, all from Churchill College, Cambridge. He taught at Christ's College, Cambridge from 1968 to 1973, before joining the faculty of the University of Sussex from 1973 to 1980 and the University of Essex from 1980 to 1983. He joined the faculty of Columbia Business School in 1983 as a professor economics.

Heal also held visiting professor positions at Yale University, Stanford University, University of Paris XII: Paris-Val-de-Marne, Princeton University, Stockholm University, University of Minnesota, University of Siena, and University of Paris X-Nanterre. He also worked at the International Institute for Applied Systems Analysis as a research scholar.

From 1972 to 1976, Heal was a managing editor of The Review of Economic Studies. He was elected a Fellow of the Econometric Society in 1977. He was made President of the Association of Environmental and Resource Economists in 1982 and was made a life fellow of the association in 2006. He received a best paper of 2013 award from the European Association of Environmental and Resource Economists in 2014.

Heal was elected a member of the National Academy of Sciences in 2016. He also received an honorary doctorate from the Université de Paris Dauphine in 2008.
