= J. E. Gordon =

Materials scientist (1913–1998)

James Edward Gordon
- Born: 9 August 1913; Kendal, Cumbria
- Died: 26 June 1998 (aged 84)
- Education: University of Glasgow
- Awards: Griffith Medal; British Silver Medal of the Royal Aeronautical Society
- Scientific career
- Fields: Materials science Biomechanical engineering
- Workplaces: University of Reading; Royal Aircraft Establishment; Tube Investments

James Edward Gordon (9 August 1913–26 June 1998) was a materials scientist and biomechanical engineer who is considered to be one of the founders of materials science and biomechanics. He was a professor of materials science at the University of Reading, and authored three books on structures and materials, which have been translated into many languages and are still widely used in schools and universities.

== Biography ==
Gordon was born in 1913 in Kendal, Cumbria. He worked for a time in the Clyde shipyards, and graduated with a degree in naval architecture from the University of Glasgow. During World War II, he served in the Home Guard whilst also working at the Royal Aircraft Establishment (RAE) where he studied composite materials, wooden aircraft, plastics and new materials of many types. He designed the rescue dinghies for most bomber aircraft used by British forces in the war, and studied the strength and behaviour of reinforcement fibres made of glass, carbon, boron and other materials.

After the war he worked at Tube Investments (TI) at the Group Research Laboratory, Hinxton Hall, near Cambridge. From 1962 he was head of a new branch at the Explosives Research and Development Establishment (ERDE), Waltham Abbey dealing with completely new structural materials. Some of his discoveries are still applied in the construction of fibre-reinforced parts for aircraft and rockets.

In 1968, Gordon was appointed as Professor of Materials Technology at the University of Reading, where he collaborated with Dr John Landels to provide a joint degree in Classics and Engineering. The annual Gordon Lecture at the University of Reading is named for him.

Gordon was an Industrial Fellow Commoner at the University of Cambridge, where the Gordon Laboratory, opened in 1999, is named in his honour.

== Titles and awards ==
- Industrial Fellow Commoner at Churchill College, Cambridge.
- Professor of Materials Technology at the University of Reading.
- British Silver Medal of the Royal Aeronautical Society
- Griffith Medal of the Materials Science Club

== Works ==
- The New Science of Strong Materials or Why You Don't Fall Through the Floor - Pelican Books, 1968 - ISBN 0-691-02380-8
- Structures: Or Why Things Don't Fall Down - Pelican Books, 1978 - ISBN 0-306-81283-5
- The Science of Structures and Materials - Scientific American Library, 1988 - ISBN 0-7167-5022-8
