= Rod Liddle =

British journalist (1960–2026)

- Born: Roderick Edwin Liddle; 1 April 1960; Sidcup, England
- Died: 2 August 2026 (aged 66); Middlesbrough, England
- Education: London School of Economics
- Occupations: Journalist; broadcaster
- Political party: Labour (until 2016); SDP (from 2019)
- Spouses: Rachel Royce (m. 2004; div. 2007); Alicia Monckton (m. 2008)
- Children: 3

Roderick Edwin Liddle (1 April 1960 – 2 August 2026) was a British journalist and broadcaster. He was an editor of BBC Radio 4's Today and an associate editor of The Spectator.

Liddle began his career at the South Wales Echo, then worked for the Labour Party, and later joined the BBC. He became editor of the Today programme in 1998, resigning in 2002 after his employers objected to one of his articles in The Guardian. Up until his death, he wrote for The Sunday Times, The Spectator and The Sun, among other publications. His journalism was often the subject of criticism and controversy.

Liddle wrote the short story collection Too Beautiful for You (2003) and the novel Love Will Destroy Everything (2007), along with The Best of Liddle Britain (2007) and the semi-autobiographical Selfish, Whining Monkeys (2014). He also presented television programmes, including The New Fundamentalists, The Trouble with Atheism, and Immigration Is A Time Bomb.

== Early life ==
Roderick Edwin Liddle was born on 1 April 1960 in Sidcup, Kent. Aged eight he moved to Nunthorpe, Middlesbrough, and was educated at Laurence Jackson School and Prior Pursglove Sixth Form College, both in the nearby town of Guisborough.

Liddle attended the London School of Economics (LSE) as a mature student, reading social psychology.

== Career ==
=== Radio and print journalism ===
Liddle's early career in journalism was with the South Wales Echo in Cardiff, where he was a general news reporter and, for a time, the rock and pop writer. He returned to journalism after graduating from the LSE, and was taken on as a trainee producer by the BBC.

Liddle was appointed editor of the BBC Radio 4 programme Today in 1998. The programme had a reputation for its political interviews, but Liddle tried, with some success, to improve the show's investigative journalism. To this end, he hired journalists from outside the BBC. Among these was Andrew Gilligan, who joined from The Sunday Telegraph in 1999. Gilligan's 29 May 2003 report on Today – that the British government had "sexed up" the intelligence dossier on Iraq, a report broadcast after Liddle had left the programme – began a chain of events that included the death in July that year of David Kelly, the weapons inspector who was Gilligan's source, and the subsequent Hutton Inquiry, a public inquiry into the circumstances of Kelly's death. Liddle defended Gilligan throughout the controversy.

Under Liddle's editorship, Today won several awards: a Sony Silver in 2002 for reports by Barnie Choudhury and Mike Thomson into the causes of race riots in the north of England; a Sony Bronze in 2003 for an investigation by Angus Stickler into paedophile priests; and an Amnesty International Media Award in 2003 for Gilligan's investigation into the sale of illegal landmines, an investigation that attracted a lengthy legal action.

While working for Today, Liddle also wrote a column for The Guardian. On 25 September 2002, referring in it to a march organised by the Countryside Alliance in defence of fox hunting, Liddle wrote that readers may have forgotten why they voted Labour in 1997, but would remember once they saw the people campaigning to save hunting. His column led The Daily Telegraph to accuse Liddle of bias and of endangering democracy. The BBC concluded that Liddle's comments breached his commitment to impartiality as a BBC programme editor, and gave him an ultimatum to stop writing his column or resign from his position on Today. He resigned on 30 September 2002. He said later that, when he was editor, he was ordered by BBC management to sack Frederick Forsyth from the programme, and speculated that it was because of Forsyth's right-wing political views. The BBC replied that the decision was made for editorial reasons.

Following his departure from Today, Liddle began writing regularly for The Spectator in October 2002. He continued to write regularly for The Spectator until his death. He continued to write for The Guardian and became an associate editor with The Spectator. He also wrote for the men's magazines GQ and Arena, and had a weekly column for The Sunday Times.

Beginning in January 2025, he presented a Saturday morning show on Times Radio.

=== Controversial writings ===
Liddle's columns were often seen as controversial. The Press Complaints Commission (PCC) censured his blog in 2010, making him the first journalist to have a blog censured in the UK. While critics accused him of being racist and misogynist, he defended his work as provoking debate or being satirical.

==== Comments on Harriet Harman ====
In August 2009, in his Spectator blog he wrote about Harriet Harman, deputy leader of the Labour Party, in unflattering terms. Liddle began the article by asking: "So – Harriet Harman, then. Would you? I mean after a few beers obviously, not while you were sober." Tanya Gold wrote in The Guardian that it was a "tissue-thin polemic" and pointing out that it was The Spectator's cover story that week. In The Observer nearly two months later, Rachel Cooke recalled finding Liddle's piece "disgusting". Cooke went on to say: "I would still like to do something really unpleasant to the man who wrote [the article]."

Liddle said two months later that the Harman column "was supposed to be a parody of guttural, base sexism", a joke he assumed readers would understand. After the negative response from Gold (and then Cooke, among other female journalists) he continued: "And then I suppose I came to the conclusion – gradually – that I must have got it wrong." In June 2014, he said that of those he had offended, Harman was the one person to whom he would apologise.

==== Comments on race, religion and colonialism ====
In November 2009, again for The Spectator website, Liddle offered "a quick update on what the Muslim savages are up to", a brief article about the stoning to death of a 20-year-old woman in Somalia after she was accused of adultery, and the similar death of a 13-year-old the year before. He made remarks, considered sarcastic, that read: "Incidentally, many Somalis have come to Britain as immigrants recently, where they are widely admired for their strong work ethic, respect for the law and keen, piercing, intelligence."

In December 2009, on his Spectator blog, Liddle referred to two black music producers, Brandon Jolie and Kingsley Ogundele, who had plotted to kill Jolie's 15-year-old pregnant girlfriend, as "human filth" and said the incident was not an anomaly. He continued:

The overwhelming majority of street crime, knife crime, gun crime, robbery and crimes of sexual violence in London is carried out by young men from the African-Caribbean community. Of course, in return, we have rap music, goat curry and a far more vibrant and diverse understanding of cultures which were once alien to us. For which, many thanks.

When he was accused of racism, Liddle said he was instead engaging in a debate about multiculturalism. In March 2010, the PCC upheld a complaint against Liddle, who became the first journalist to be censured over the contents of a blog, because he had not been able to prove his claim about the crime statistics. After the publication of London crime figures in June 2010, The Sunday Telegraph suggested Liddle was largely right on some of his claims, but that he was probably wrong on his claims about knife crimes and violent sex crimes.

On 23 May 2013, Liddle wrote about the murder of soldier Lee Rigby near the Royal Artillery Barracks in Woolwich, London. In the original version of a blog article for The Spectator, he referred to the perpetrators as "two black savages". After many objections to his language use, this phrase was modified. Liddle apologised.

In a blog article for The Spectator website published shortly after the death of Nelson Mandela, Liddle wrote that the BBC coverage of his death was excessive, characterising it as "famous nice black man dies" and believing that Mandela had to "bear [the BBC's] entire self-flagellating white post-colonial bien pensant guilt." Richard Garside, director of the Centre for Crime and Justice Studies, described him as an "attention seeking wind-up merchant".

In October 2019, Liddle penned a column in The Spectator commenting on the forthcoming December general election, which suggested that the election should be held on a Muslim holy day to reduce the Labour vote. The column was criticised by senior political figures including Chancellor of the Exchequer Sajid Javid and former Conservative Deputy Prime Minister David Lidington. Liddle defended the content as being humorous. The article also criticised the Labour MP Rosie Duffield's recent speech about her experience of trying to exit an abusive relationship; Duffield described the article as "racist and misogynistic".

Giving a speech at Durham University in December 2021, Liddle said: "It is fairly easily proven that colonialism is not remotely the major cause of Africa's problems, just as it is very easy to prove that the educational underachievement of British people of Caribbean descent or African Americans is nothing to do with institutional or structural racism." Many attendees walked out, with the speech later being described as "transphobic and racist" by the student newspaper.

==== Independent editor rumour and Millwall supporters' website ====
The Guardian reported on 8 January 2010 that the expected purchase of The Independent by Alexander Lebedev, a Russian billionaire, would be followed by the appointment of Liddle as editor. Roy Greenslade wrote on 11 January that the reports were provoking a "major internal and external revolt" by The Independent's staff and readers.

In January 2010, the press drew attention to allegedly racist and misogynist comments posted under the username "monkeymfc" – a name Liddle has used – on Millwall Online, a fan club web forum with no official connection to Millwall Football Club. Liddle attributed some of the comments to opposition fans logging in under his name to embarrass him. He later said he had written some of the posts that were being criticised. One post, in which he joked about not being able to smoke at Auschwitz, led to his being asked to explain what he meant in The Jewish Chronicle. While he said in June 2014 that his comments were taken out of context, he said that he did not regret making them. "No. Never. Absolutely not. I thought about my mates at Millwall Online, God I respect them so much more than these other people, these ghastly fucking people."

The stories about Liddle's posts on Millwall Online apparently further reduced the likelihood of his being offered the job. Finally, on 19 February, Stephen Brook of The Guardian reported that Liddle was no longer in the running for the post. Tim Luckhurst, professor of journalism at the University of Kent, argued that Liddle's prospects of editing The Independent were nullified "by the people behind a viciously intolerant campaign of liberal bigotry".

==== Comments in contempt of court on Stephen Lawrence trial ====
In November 2011, an article by Liddle for The Spectator suggested the trial of two men accused (and later convicted) of murdering Stephen Lawrence would not be fair. It was referred to the Attorney General Dominic Grieve by the judge for possible contempt of court, and he ordered the jurors not to read it. Having decided that it might have breached a court order, Grieve passed the case to the Director of Public Prosecutions. The decision that The Spectator was to be prosecuted for breaching reporting restrictions was announced on 9 May 2012, with a court hearing scheduled for 7 June, although Liddle as the author was not himself liable for prosecution. Fraser Nelson, the magazine's editor, announced that the prosecution would not be contested, and the magazine pleaded guilty at the hearing. The fine was £3,000, plus £2,000 compensation to Stephen Lawrence's parents and £625 costs.

==== Comments on disabled and transgender people ====
In January 2012, Liddle wrote that many people in the UK were "pretending to be disabled" in his column for The Sun, an opinion defended by James Delingpole. Frances Ryan in The Guardian criticised his comments.

In May 2015, the Independent Press Standards Organisation (IPSO) upheld a complaint from Trans Media Watch that Liddle had been discriminatory towards Emily Brothers, a blind and transgender Labour candidate at the 2015 general election, in two Sun columns published in December 2014 and January 2015. In commenting in the way he had Liddle had breached two sections of the editors' code.

==== Comments about sexual abuse of children ====
Writing in 2012 in The Spectator, Liddle stated that "the one thing stopping me from being a teacher was that I could not remotely conceive of not trying to shag the kids" and that he did not expect to "[dabble] much below year ten" (corresponding to age 14–15). In December 2020, Ash Sarkar tweeted about Liddle's article. Liddle was opposed to laws against viewing child sexual abuse material, writing in The Guardian in 2003 that "we should not be in the business of putting people in prison for simply looking at things". Jenni Murray said she was "shocked" at Liddle's "glib dismissal" of "any causal link between viewing child porn and abusing children".

==== Comments on male homosexuality ====
During a parliamentary debate on the Psychoactive Substances Bill – which "makes it an offence to produce, supply, offer to supply, possess with intent to supply, possess on custodial premises, import or export psychoactive substances" the Conservative MP Crispin Blunt admitted he used amyl nitrite (poppers):

And would be directly affected by this legislation. And I was astonished to find that it's proposed they be banned and, frankly, so were very many gay men.

Liddle responded in his Spectator blog:

So, Crispin Blunt MP feels hurt because laws proscribing amyl nitrate [sic] (or 'poppers') would criminalise the entire gay community. ... I would have thought that the requirement for amyl nitrate to relax the sphincter muscle and lube to accommodate entry was God's way of telling you that what you're about to do is unnatural and perverse. Or your body's way of telling you – your call. So eeeeuw. ... Crispin and others can always use a jemmy [crowbar] instead.

The satirical magazine Private Eye described this as hypocritical, pointing out Liddle's account in The Sunday Times of using Viagra in July 2004. A spokesperson from the LGBT rights charity Stonewall called Liddle a "repeat offending bigot".

=== Books ===
In 2003, Liddle published a collection of short stories, Too Beautiful For You. He said he had always wanted to be a writer, and saw journalism as a cop-out. He was also the author of Love Will Destroy Everything (2007) and The Best of Liddle Britain (2007).

Selfish, Whining Monkeys: How we Ended Up Greedy, Narcissistic and Unhappy appeared in 2014. Admitting to having paid little attention to Liddle's journalism, Will Self, in his review for The Guardian wrote: "it's so much more authoritative to hear a man condemned out of his own mouth over 200-plus pages than it is to assay him on the basis of newspaper columns, which, by and large, favour polarised views tendentiously expressed." Despite his serious reservations about Liddle's writing, Self concludes: "The peculiar thing is that I can't find it in my heart of hearts to dislike the man, I think there's good in him and that he can change his bilious complexion." Liddle responded to Self's review in an interview with Archie Bland of The Independent a few weeks later: "He reviewed what he thought I was, not what the book was about. Bizarre. I think it's slightly deranged."

In 2019, Liddle published The Great Betrayal, a book about Brexit. The book was reviewed positively by Matt Goodwin in The Sunday Times, who called it "a no-holds-barred attack on the Establishment's blocking of Brexit". Harry Mount at The Spectator called the book "very engaging", despite noting concerns that the book's claim of a betrayal of Brexit possibly proving to be unfounded. However, Fintan O'Toole writing for The Guardian said the book was "as untroubled by facts as by logic".

=== Television ===
In 2003, Liddle co-presented the short-lived BBC Two political show Weekend with Kate Silverton, described by The Independent on Sunday as "the worst programme anywhere, ever, in the history of time", and BBC Four's The Talk Show. He also became a team captain on Call My Bluff.

In The New Fundamentalists, a programme in the Dispatches strand broadcast in March 2006, Liddle, a member of the Church of England, condemned the rise of evangelicalism and Christian fundamentalism in Britain, especially the anti-Darwinian influence of such beliefs in faith schools, and criticised the social teaching and cultural influence of this strand of Christianity. The documentary was criticised by David Hilborn of the Evangelical Alliance, and by Rupert Kaye of the Association of Christian Teachers.

In The Trouble with Atheism, Liddle argued that atheists can be as dogmatic and intolerant as the adherents of religion. Liddle said, "History has shown us that it's not religion that's the problem, but any system of thought that insists that one group of people are inviolably in the right, whereas the others are in the wrong and must somehow be punished."

Liddle's Immigration Is a Time Bomb was broadcast by Channel 4 in 2005. Complaints that followed it included that he should not have allowed British National Party leader Nick Griffin to speak unchallenged. Ofcom adjudicated that the programme was fair, and the complaints were dismissed. Liddle subsequently argued, after Griffin was acquitted in February 2006 of two charges of inciting racial hatred, that the charges were "too ephemeral, too dependent upon the mindset and political disposition of the juror, and upon what is happening outside of the courtroom, on the streets."

In April 2007, Liddle presented a two-hour-long theological documentary called The Bible Revolution, where he looked back in history to William Tyndale's translation of the Bible into English and the effect this had upon the English language. On 21 May 2007, he presented an hour-long documentary, Battle for the Holy Land: Love Thy Neighbour, about the Israeli-Palestinian Conflict. He visited Bethlehem, Hebron, and the Israeli settlement of Tekoa. Liddle sought to examine whether Israel was a true liberal democracy in light of its treatment of the Palestinians. He also appeared in Channel 4's alternative election night episode of Come Dine with Me, along with Edwina Currie, Derek Hatton, and Brian Paddick.

Liddle appeared on the BBC's Newsnight, hosted by Emily Maitlis, to discuss Brexit on 15 July 2019. In the episode, Maitlis said Liddle wrote columns containing "consistent casual racism week after week" and asked him if he would describe himself as a racist. After the episode was broadcast, a complainant alleged that Maitlis was "sneering and bullying" towards Liddle. An investigation by the BBC upheld these complaints, saying that Maitlis was "persistent and personal" in her criticism of Liddle, thus "leaving her open to the charge that she had failed to be even-handed" in the discussion.

=== Political activity ===
Aged 16, Liddle was a member of the Socialist Workers Party, remaining a member for about a year, and supported the Campaign for Nuclear Disarmament (CND) around the same time. He campaigned for the Labour Party in the 1983 general election, canvassing votes door to door in full punk get-up. He estimated that, in doing so, "I must have singlehandedly lost my party a good 5,000 votes". From 1983 to 1987, he worked as a speechwriter and researcher for Labour.

Liddle supported Brexit. He joined the Social Democratic Party in 2019, saying that as a political movement "it stresses the commonality shared between citizens, rather than the differences." He stood as a candidate for the SDP in Middlesbrough South and East Cleveland during the 2024 general election, a seat then held by the Conservative Simon Clarke. Liddle gained 1,835 votes and came fourth, with Labour defeating Clarke to win the seat.

== Personal life ==
Liddle met Rachel Royce, a television presenter, at the BBC in 1993, and the couple soon became romantically involved. In January 2004 the couple married at a ceremony in Malaysia. They had been living in Heytesbury, Wiltshire, and had two sons together. Six months later, Liddle moved in with Alicia Monckton, a 22-year-old receptionist at The Spectator. It transpired that he had cut short his honeymoon with Royce so that he could be with Monckton. Following their divorce, Liddle and Royce exchanged attacks in the media. Liddle called her a "total slut and slattern", and Royce wrote an article in the Daily Mail titled "My cheating husband Rod, 10 bags of manure and me the bunny boiler. As for The Slapper [...] she's welcome to him."

On 5 May 2005, Liddle was arrested for common assault against Monckton, who was 20 weeks pregnant at the time. He admitted the offence and accepted a police caution, but said later that he did so only because it was the quickest way for him to be released and that he had not assaulted her. The couple's daughter was born in October 2005.

== Death ==
Liddle died at James Cook University Hospital in Middlesbrough, on 2 August 2026, aged 66. He had been suffering from chronic obstructive pulmonary disease in the previous months.

=== Reactions ===
Writing for The Daily Telegraph, Allison Pearson described Liddle as "a great British freedom fighter" and a "valiant warrior in the culture wars", as well as "a people's champion who united anyone and everyone with a brain and a heart". David Yelland said Liddle "morphed into a brilliant and gifted writer who I could rarely agree with but always turned to first". The Today presenter Justin Webb described Liddle as "brilliant, kind and funny".

After Liddle's obituaries were published, Zoe Williams, who had been a friend in the 1990s, described them in The Guardian as "markedly coy and sanitised", referring in particular to Justin Webb and Amol Rajan's comments on his distrust of authority. She said that Liddle had changed since the 1990s from being left wing to "an attack dog for the race-baiting right", and that his later targets had not been the authorities but marginalised groups.

== Bibliography ==
=== Fiction ===
- Too Beautiful for You. Century. 2003. ISBN 978-1844133789.
- Love Will Destroy Everything. Random House. 2007. ISBN 978-1844133796.

=== Non-fiction ===
- The Best of Liddle Britain. Spectator. 2007. ISBN 978-0955117312.
- Selfish, Whining Monkeys: How We Ended Up Greedy, Narcissistic and Unhappy. Fourth Estate. 2014. ISBN 978-0007351275.
- The Great Betrayal. Constable. 2019. ISBN 978-1472132376.

Media offices
Preceded by Roger Mosey	Editor of Today; 1998–2002	Succeeded by Kevin Marsh
