= E.J. Chichilnisky =

Neurobiologist and academic (born 1965)

Eduardo Jose Chichilnisky (shortened to E.J.; born 1965) (Note: Sources attest various spelling and typographical differences of his name. As Eduardo Jose: "Chichilnisky, Graciela". Who's Who in American Education 2006–2007 (7th ed.). Marquis Who's Who. 2005. p. 299. ISBN 0-8379-2708-0.; "Collaborators". Neural Interfaces Lab. The University of Texas at Dallas. "Chichilnisky Lab – Dr. Eduardo Jose (E.J.) Chichilnisky"; As Eduardo-Jose: Chichilnisky, Graciela (June–August 1984). "Terms of trade, domestic distribution and export-led growth". Journal of Development Economics. 15 (1–3): 177–184. doi:10.1016/0304-3878(84)90015-4. "... by the computer simulation of Eduardo-Jose Chichilnisky (1984) which reproduces numerically my Proposition 3 ..."; As Eduardo José: "Professor Dr. Eduardo José Chichilnisky". GEPRIS. DFG.; As Eduardo-José: Chichilnisky, Graciela (1976). Manifolds of Preferences and Equilibria (Dissertation). University of California, Berkeley. "I am also grateful to my son Eduardo-José Chichilnisky for providing support and sympathy when it was needed.") is an Argentine-born neurobiologist and academic. He has worked at Stanford University since 2013, and serves as John R. Adler Professor of Neurosurgery.

== Personal life and education ==
E.J. Chichilnisky was born 1965 in Buenos Aires, Argentina to then-unmarried Graciela Chichilnisky. Graciela moved to the United States for graduate education at the Massachusetts Institute of Technology within the first few years of E.J.'s lifetime, and raised him as a single mother. E.J. received a Bachelor of Arts degree in mathematics from Princeton University and subsequently earned a Master of Science degree in mathematics and a Doctor of Philosophy (Ph.D.) degree in neuroscience from Stanford University. His Stanford Ph.D. dissertation was entitled Perceptual Measurements of Neural Computations in Color Appearance.

Speaking on Andrew Huberman's podcast in 2024, Chichilnisky described his path through education—the Ph.D. program in neuroscience was the third doctoral program at Stanford that he had pursued; he had earlier started and dropped programs in math and in economics.

== Career and research ==
Chichilnisky's research focuses on understanding the spatiotemporal electrical activity patterns in the retina, which are essential for transmitting visual information to the brain. Chichilnisky's work involves studying these patterns and their relationship to retinal circuitry through the use of extensive multi-electrode recordings. He has also worked in characterizing retinal cells' neural signaling.

A central theme of Chichilnisky’s research is deciphering how retinal ganglion cells encode visual information. Using high-density multielectrode arrays, his laboratory has characterized the response properties, cell-type diversity, and connectivity patterns of primate and human retinal ganglion cells.

Chichilnisky has made significant contributions to understanding how retinal neurons respond to extracellular electrical stimulation, a critical problem for the development of next-generation retinal implants. His group showed that the electrical sensitivity of individual retinal ganglion cells can be inferred from features of their spontaneous activity, enabling indirect estimation of stimulation thresholds for large neuronal populations.

Chichilnisky leads the Stanford Artificial Retina Project, an interdisciplinary effort to create a high-fidelity retinal prosthesis capable of restoring vision through cellular-resolution, cell-type-specific stimulation.

Before joining Stanford, Chichilnisky worked at the Salk Institute for Biological Studies. He worked for Salk from 1998 to 2013, the year he joined Stanford University. At Stanford, he is a professor of neurosurgery and of ophthalmology, and, by courtesy, of electrical engineering.
