= Ralph Abraham (mathematician) =

American mathematician (1936–2024)

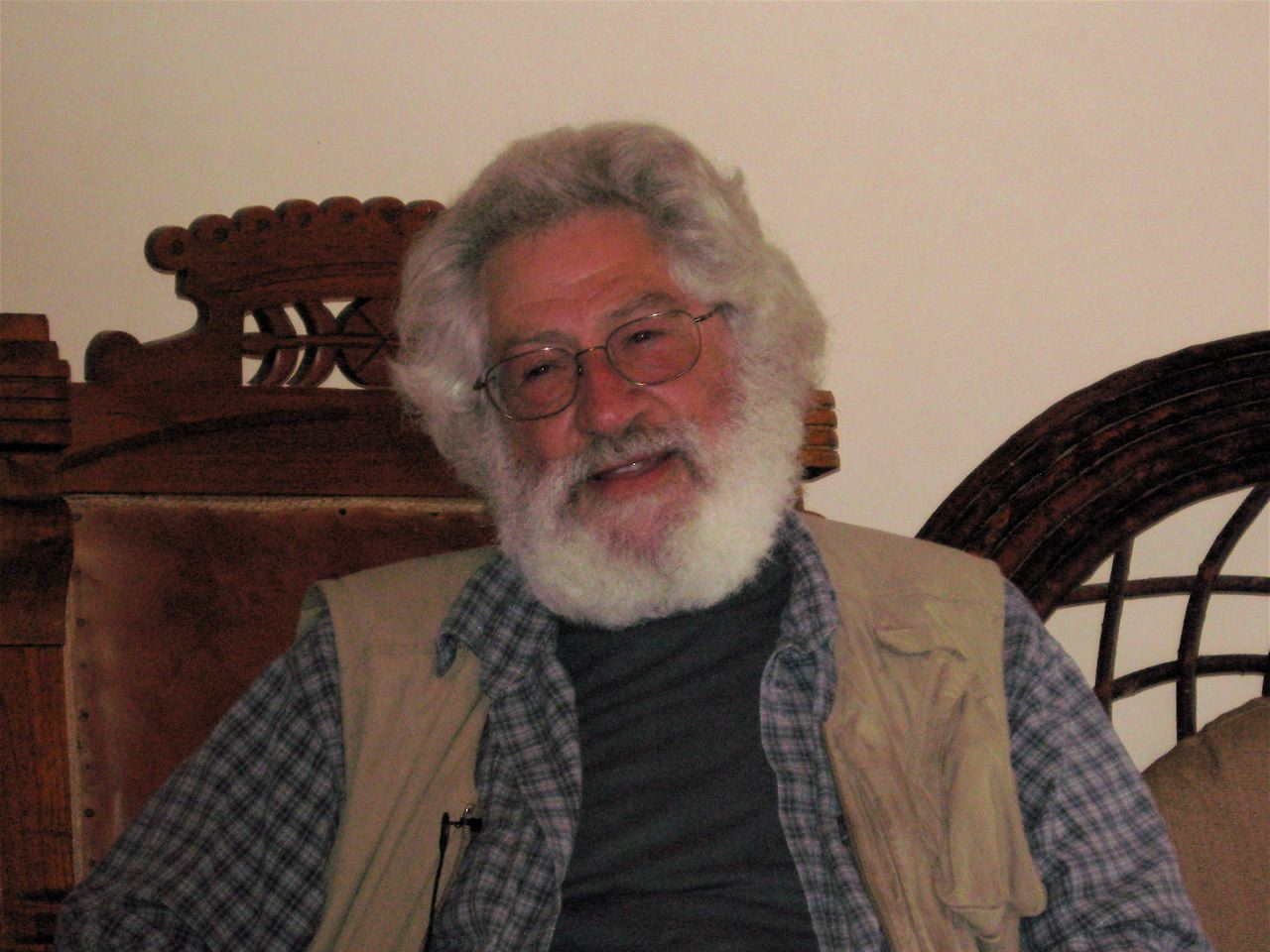
- Abraham in 2008
- Born: Ralph Herman Abraham; July 4, 1936; Burlington, Vermont, U.S.
- Died: September 19, 2024 (aged 88); Santa Cruz, California, U.S.
- Education: University of Michigan
- Scientific career
- Fields: Mathematics
- Institutions: University of California, Santa Cruz
- Thesis: Discontinuities in General Relativity (1960)
- Doctoral advisor: Nathaniel Coburn

Ralph Herman Abraham (July 4, 1936 – September 19, 2024) was an American mathematician. In 1968 he became a member of the faculty of the University of California, Santa Cruz (UCSC), and later stayed on as a professor emeritus of mathematics.

== Life and work ==
Abraham earned his BSE (1956), MS (1958), and PhD (1960) from the University of Michigan. His PhD thesis, titled Discontinuities in General Relativity, was written under the direction of Nathaniel Coburn. Prior to joining UCSC, he held positions at the University of California, Berkeley (research lecturer in mathematics; 1960–1962), Columbia University (postdoctoral fellow and assistant professor of mathematics; 1962–1964) and Princeton University (assistant professor of mathematics; 1964–1968). He has also held visiting positions in Amsterdam, Paris, Warwick, Barcelona, Basel, and Florence.

He founded the Visual Math Institute at UCSC in 1975; at that time, it was called the "Visual Mathematics Project". He was editor of World Futures and for the International Journal of Bifurcations and Chaos. Abraham was a member of cultural historian William Irwin Thompson's Lindisfarne Association.

Abraham has been involved in the development of dynamical systems theory since the 1960s and 1970s. He has been a consultant on chaos theory and its applications in numerous fields, such as medical physiology, ecology, mathematical economics, and psychotherapy.

Another interest of Abraham's concerns alternative ways of expressing mathematics, for example visually or aurally. He has staged performances in which mathematics, visual arts and music are combined into one presentation. Abraham developed an interest in "Hip" activities in Santa Cruz in the 1960s and had a website gathering information on the topic. He credited his use of the psychedelic drug DMT with "swerv[ing his] career toward a search for the connections between mathematics and the experience of the Logos".

Abraham died at his home in Santa Cruz County, at the age of 88.

== Works ==
Publications

- 1987. Foundations of Mechanics, 2nd edn. With Jerrold E. Marsden; 1st edition 1967
- 1988. Manifolds, Tensor Analysis, and Applications, 2nd edn. With Jerrold E. Marsden and Tudor Ratiu. doi:10.1007/978-1-4612-1029-0
- 1992. Dynamics, the Geometry of Behavior, 2nd edn. With C. D. Shaw
- 1992. Trialogues on the Edge of the West. With Terence McKenna and Rupert Sheldrake
- 1992. Chaos, Gaia, Eros
- 1995. The Web Empowerment Book. With Frank Jas and Will Russell
- 1995. Chaos in Discrete Dynamical Systems. With Laura Gardini and Christian Mira.
- 1997. The Evolutionary Mind. With Terence McKenna and Rupert Sheldrake
- 2000. The Chaos Avant-garde. With Yoshisuke Ueda
- 2011. Bolts From the Blue
- 2016. Hip Santa Cruz, Vol. 1.

Film

- 1989. The Strange New Science of Chaos, as himself
- 2009. Cognition Factor 2009, as himself
- 2010. DMT: The Spirit Molecule, as himself
