= Singularity (systems theory) =

Topic in systems theory

In systems theory, a singularity refers to a critical condition in which relatively small changes, perturbations, or events may produce disproportionately large, nonlinear, or irreversible effects on the behaviour, identity, or development of a system. Such singularities may occur in physical, biological, cognitive, social, or organizational systems.

The concept differs from mathematical or gravitational singularities, as it does not primarily describe infinite values in equations or spacetime, but rather sensitive interactions between structural conditions and triggering events in complex systems.

In systems theory, singularities are often associated with instability, path dependence, phase transitions, self-organization, and critical transitions.

== Historical roots ==
In the study of unstable systems, James Clerk Maxwell in 1873 was the first to use the term singularity in its most general sense: that in which it refers to contexts in which arbitrarily small changes, commonly unpredictably, may lead to arbitrarily large effects. In this sense, Maxwell did not differentiate between dynamical systems and social systems. He used the concept of singularities primarily as an argument against determinism or absolute causality. He did not in his day deny that the same initial conditions would always achieve the same results, but pointed out that such a statement is of little value in a world in which the same initial conditions are never repeated. In the late pre-quantum-theoretic philosophy of science, this was a significant recognition of the principle of underdetermination.

== Characteristics ==
The attributes of singularities include the following in various degrees, according to context:

1. Instability: because singularities tend to produce effects out of proportion to the size of initial causes.
2. System relatedness: the effects of a singularity are characteristic of the system.
3. Uniqueness: The nature of a singularity does not arise from the scale of the cause, so much as of its qualitative nature.
4. Irreversibility: Events at a singularity commonly are irreversible; one cannot un-crack a glass with the same force that cracked it.
5. Subjectivity: In phenomenology rather than physical science, awareness is dependent on human perception.
6. Randomness: Some classes of singularities are seen as random because the causes or their effects are unknown or nonexistent (e.g., in QM or coin-flipping).
7. Complexity: Occurrence of singularities often arises from the complexity of the system in its relation to its environment.
8. Interaction: Singularities often arise when unexpected interactions occur between two systems.

== In dynamical systems ==
Henri Poincaré developed Maxwell's ideas on singularities in dynamic systems. Poincaré distinguished four different simple singularities in the singular points of differential equations. he mentioned:

- the node (les noeuds),
- the saddle (les cols),
- the focus (les foyers) and
- the center (les centers).

In recent times, chaos theory has attracted a great deal of work, but deterministic chaos is just a special case of a singularity in which a small cause produces a large observable effect as a result of nonlinear dynamic behavior. In contrast the singularities raised by Maxwell, such as a loose rock at a singular point on a slope, show a linear dynamic behavior as Poincaré demonstrated.

Singularities are a common staple of chaos theory, catastrophe theory, and bifurcation theory.

== In social systems ==
In social systems, deterministic chaos is infrequent, because the elements of the system include individuals whose values, awareness, will, foresight, and fallibility, affect the dynamic behavior of the system. However, this does not completely exclude any notional possibility of deterministic chaos in social systems. In fact some authorities argue an increase in the development of nonlinear dynamics and instabilities of social systems.

In the colloquial sense of disorder or confusion, however, chaos certainly occurs in social systems. It often is the basis for singularities, where cause-and-effect relationships are ill-defined at best. Many examples of singularities in social systems arise from the work of Maxwell and Poincaré. Maxwell remarked that a word can start a war and that all the great discoveries of humanity emerged from singular states. Poincaré gives the example of a roofer who drops a brick and randomly kills a passing man, but there is no clear limit to how small an event could cause an indefinitely large divergence in history; a single decay event of an unstable isotope could change the history of the world within a generation.

== In universal history ==
The currently dominant theory of the origin of our universe postulates a physical singularity (specifically the Big Bang). It is suggested to have dispersed plasma uniformly throughout space, and to have cooled by increasing expansion, till atoms formed; subsequently, very small (singular) fluctuations in the uniform density created self-reinforcing inhomogeneities. These subsequently grew into stars, galaxies, and other systems, from which life forms eventually emerged, a process that still is under way. Even if the singularity of the Big Bang can be omitted from the mathematical models, many other singularities remain ubiquitous in the history of the universe.

Biological evolutionary history shows that not only mutations that give rise to microevolution can amount to singularities, but that macroevolutionary events that affect the entire course of the history of the biosphere also amount to singularities. Recently, Ward and Kirschvink have argued that the history of life has been more influenced by disasters that generated singularities, than by continuous evolution. Disastrous singularities that create niches for biological innovations that give rise to productive singularities.

== Singularities and complexity ==
Concepts of singularity and of complexity are closely related. Maxwell pointed out that the more singular points a system has, the more complex it is likely to be. Complexity in turn is the basis of perceived chaos and singularities. This commonly renders it impossible, or even meaningless, to determine a seemingly insignificant event that produces a great effect, even in a simple context; in a complex situation with many elements and relationships it commonly is impossible.

Complexity may amount to a breeding ground for singularities, and this has emerged in the downfall of many, perhaps all, ancient cultures and modern countries. Individual causes such as intruders, internal conflicts or natural disasters commonly do not suffice to destroy a culture. More often an increasing complexity of interdependent factors has rendered a community vulnerable to the loss of a few infrastructural necessities that lead to successive collapse in a domino effect.

The 2008 financial crisis illustrated such effects. Accordingly, the complexity of financial systems is a major challenge for financial markets and institutions to deal with. Notionally one solution would be to reduce complexity and increase the potential for adaptation and robustness. In a complex world with increasing singularities, some people assert that it is therefore necessary to abandon optimization potential to gain adaptability to external shocks and disasters. However, no one has yet demonstrated how to implement such a solution.
