= Tosio Kato =

Japanese mathematician (1917–1999)

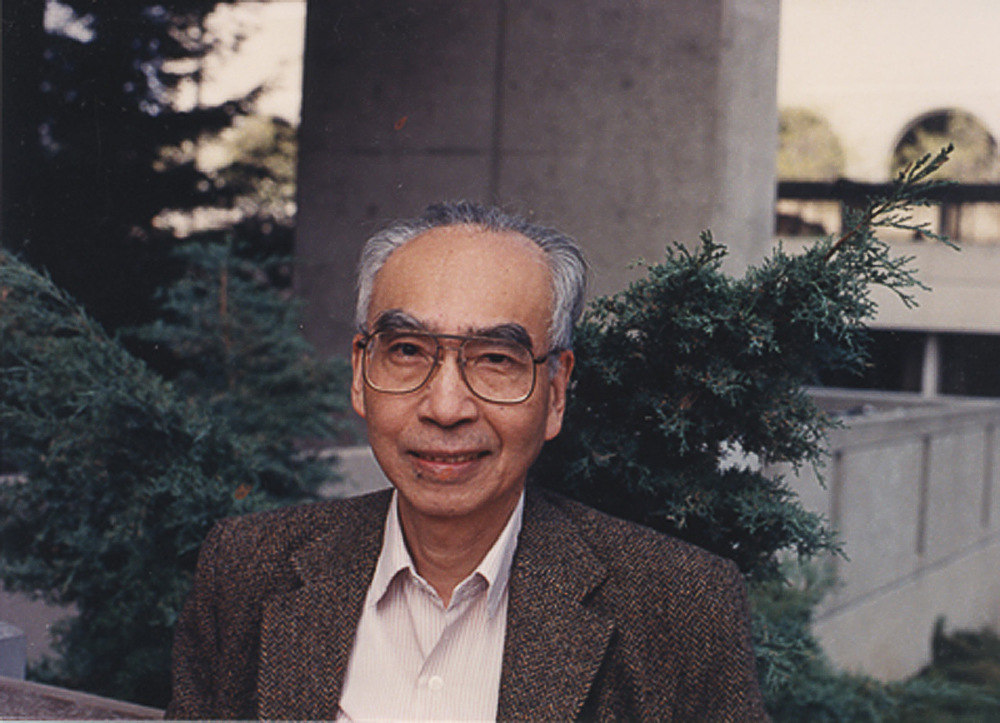
- Born: August 25, 1917; Kanuma, Tochigi, Japan
- Died: October 2, 1999 (aged 82); Oakland, California, US
- Citizenship: Japan
- Education: Imperial University of Tokyo
- Known for: Kato's conjecture Kato theorem Kato's inequality Heinz–Kato inequality Kato–Rellich Theorem
- Awards: Asahi Prize (1960); Norbert Wiener Prize in Applied Mathematics (1980)
- Scientific career
- Fields: Mathematics
- Workplaces: University of Tokyo; University of California at Berkeley
- Doctoral advisor: Kwan-ichi Terazawa

Tosio Kato (加藤 敏夫, Katō Toshio; August 25, 1917 – October 2, 1999) was a Japanese mathematician who worked with partial differential equations, mathematical physics and functional analysis.

== Education and career ==
Kato studied physics and received his undergraduate degree in 1941 at the Imperial University of Tokyo. After disruption of the Second World War, he received his doctorate in 1951 from the University of Tokyo, where he became a professor in 1958. From 1962, he worked as a professor at the University of California at Berkeley in the United States.

Many works of Kato are related to mathematical physics. In 1951, he showed the self-adjointness of Hamiltonians for realistic (singular) potentials. He dealt with nonlinear evolution equations, the Korteweg–de Vries equation (Kato smoothing effect in 1983) and with solutions of the Navier–Stokes equation. Kato is also known for his influential book Perturbation theory of linear operators, published by Springer-Verlag.

In 1980, he won the Norbert Wiener Prize in Applied Mathematics from AMS and SIAM. In 1970, he gave a plenary lecture at the ICM in Nice (scattering theory and perturbation of continuous spectra).

== Publications ==
- Kato, Tosio (1955). Linear differential equations in banach spaces. Institute of Fine Arts Library New York University. New York: Courant Institute of Mathematical Sciences, New York University.
- Kato, Tosio (1957). "On the eigenfunctions of many-particle systems in quantum mechanics". Communications on Pure and Applied Mathematics. 10 (2): 151–177. doi:10.1002/cpa.3160100201. ISSN 0010-3640.
- Perturbation theory of linear operators. Principles of Mathematical Sciences, Springer-Verlag, 1966, 1976.
- A short introduction to the perturbation theory of linear operators. Springer-Verlag 1982.

== See also ==
- Lie product formula
- Weyl–von Neumann theorem
