= Michael Lacey (mathematician) =

American mathematician

Michael Thoreau Lacey (born September 26, 1959) is an American mathematician. Lacey received his PhD from the University of Illinois at Urbana-Champaign in 1987, under the direction of Walter Philipp. His thesis was in the area of probability in Banach spaces, and solved a problem related to the law of the iterated logarithm for empirical characteristic functions. In the intervening years, his work has touched on the areas of probability, ergodic theory, and harmonic analysis.

His first postdoctoral positions were at the Louisiana State University, and the University of North Carolina at Chapel Hill. While at UNC, Lacey and Walter Philipp gave their proof of the almost sure central limit theorem.

He held a position at Indiana University from 1989 to 1996. While there, he received a National Science Foundation Postdoctoral Fellowship, and during the tenure of this fellowship he began a study of the bilinear Hilbert transform. This transform was at the time the subject of a conjecture by Alberto Calderón that Lacey and Christoph Thiele solved in 1996, for which they were awarded the Salem Prize.

Since 1996, he has been a professor of mathematics at the Georgia Institute of Technology. In 2004, he received a Guggenheim Fellowship for joint work with Xiaochun Li. In 2012 he became a fellow of the American Mathematical Society.
