= Crestone, Colorado =

Town in Colorado, US

- Statutory town
- Town of Crestone
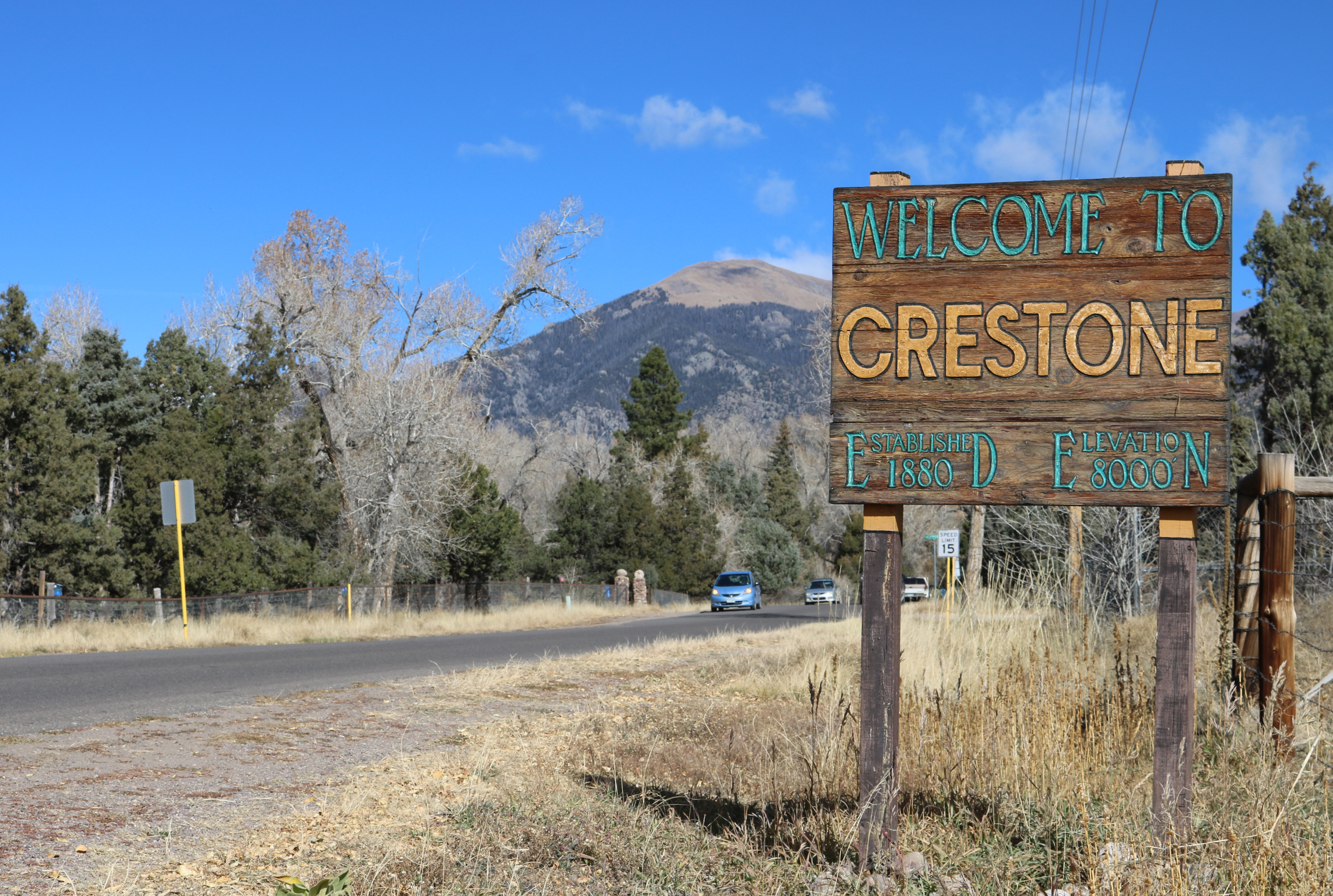
- Welcome sign on Birch Street,

- Location of the Town of Crestone in Saguache County, Colorado
- Coordinates: 37°59′40″N 105°41′46″W
- Country: United States
- State: Colorado
- County: Saguache
- <-- Settled -->: 1880
- Incorporated: January 24, 1902

Government
  - Type: Statutory town

Area
  - Total: 0.385 sq mi (0.996 km^{2})
  - Land: 0.385 sq mi (0.996 km^{2})
  - Water: 0 sq mi (0.000 km^{2})
- Elevation: 7,930 ft (2,420 m)

Population (2020)
  - Total: 141
  - Density: 367/sq mi (142/km^{2})
- Time zone: UTC−07:00 (MST)
  - Summer (DST): UTC−06:00 (MDT)
- ZIP code: 81131
- Area codes: 719
- GNIS town ID: 2412387
- FIPS code: 18420
- Website: townofcrestone.gov

The Town of Crestone is a statutory town in Saguache County, Colorado. The town's population was 141 according to the 2020 United States census. Crestone is located at the foot of the Sangre de Cristo Range, on the eastern edge of the San Luis Valley. In 1880, George Adams and E. A. Reser purchased land adjoining the northern boundary of the Luis Maria Baca Grant No. 4 and filed the town plat for Crestone on November 4 of that year. In 1971, the Arizona-Colorado Land and Cattle Company formed the Baca Grande Corporation to develop a part of the ranch as the Baca Grande community. By 2012, the development contained approximately 4,000 lots, about 25% of which had been developed.

The Crestone area, which includes the Baca Grande and Moffat, Colorado, is a spiritual center for several religions, including a Hindu temple, a Zen center, several Tibetan Buddhist centers, and various New Age activities. Much of this spiritual development was catalyzed by the couple Hanne and Maurice Strong in the 1970s, who set out to make it an interfaith center.

Crestone is named for the 14,000-foot peaks that lie just east of the town: Crestone Peak and Crestone Needle. The Crestones, as they are known collectively, in turn, took their name from the Spanish word crestón, which, according to Walter Borneman and Lyndon Lampert's book A Climbing Guide to Colorado’s Fourteeners, means: “the top of a cock’s comb”; “the crest of a helmet”; or, in miners’ jargon, “an outcropping of ore”.

== History ==
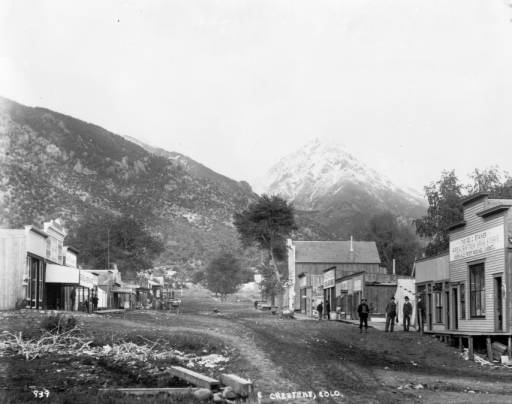
Galena Avenue June 1901

The first settlement in the Crestone area occurred after the American Civil War with the granting of the Luis Maria Baca Grant No. 4 in 1860 to the heirs of the original Baca Grant at Las Vegas, New Mexico. Title to the grant at Las Vegas was clouded by a second grant of the same land to the residents of Las Vegas, the Bacas having abandoned their grant after the deaths of the founder to a Mexican soldier in 1827 and of his oldest son at the hands of the Navajo in 1835. The Baca heirs were offered alternative lands from the public lands of the United States. The square tract selected is 12.5 miles (20.1 km) on a side south of Saguache County Road T south of Crestone. The Bacas deeded the land to their attorney, but it soon passed by tax sale to a third party. The ranch headquarters were on Crestone Creek to the southwest of Crestone. The Baca Grant was one of the first large tracts of land to be fenced in the West and was the home of prize Hereford cattle.

In addition to ranching, there was some mining in the area to the east and south of Crestone of small shallow iron oxide copper gold ore deposits. In 1880, the town of Crestone was platted by George Adams, the owner of the Baca Grant. The Crestone, Colorado, post office opened on November 16, 1880. In 1900, with the help of Eastern investors, George Adams ignited a minor boom, reopening one of the more promising gold mines and building a railroad spur to the town and the mines along the Range south of town. The Town of Crestone was incorporated on January 24, 1902 Lacking good ore, the boom was short-lived. A long period of decline followed.

By 1948, Crestone had declined to its post-war population of 40, mostly retirees and cowboys who worked on the Grant, a nickname for the Baca Grant. Many of the old cabins were used as vacation homes. By 1971, the Baca Grant came into the ownership of a corporation that subdivided a portion of the Grant, creating the Baca Grande, a subdivision originally platted for about 10,000 lots. At great expense, underground utilities were installed, and roads were built. However, sales lagged and by 1979 the development was considered a liability by the corporation. Maurice Strong, owner of a controlling interest, and his fiancée, Hanne Marstrand, visited the development and "fell in love with it". They were inspired to create a world spiritual center and began granting parcels of land to traditional spiritual organizations.

The population gradually began to increase and by 2006 several hundred homes had been built and small spiritual communities had become established. As the Baca Grande contained no provision for business uses, Crestone became the business center of the community and, having enacted a sales tax, was in a position to finance further improvements.

== Geography ==
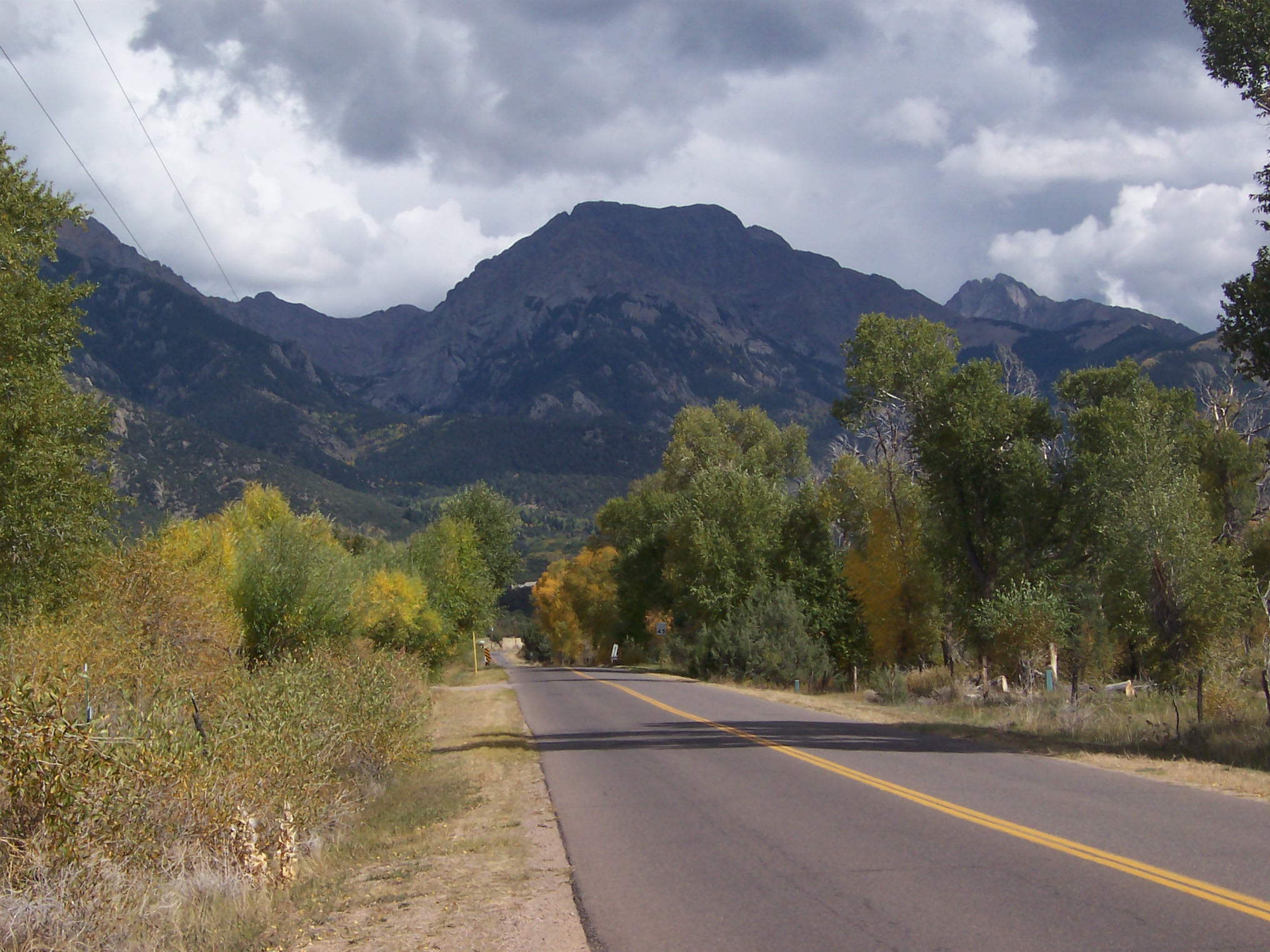
Approach to Crestone at the east end of Road T. The square topped mountain is Kit Carson Mountain, the peak on the right is Crestone Peak.

Crestone is located near the 38th parallel, in the San Luis Valley in south-central Colorado. It is platted on a quarter section of land, or 160 acres (0.65 km^{2}), on the alluvial fan of North Crestone Creek. Much of the land near the creek where the main part of the city sits, is well watered in normal times, but during a prolonged drought the creek may dry up and underground water levels may fall.

At the 2020 United States census, the town had a total area of 246 acres (0.996 km^{2}), all of it land.

=== Access ===
Saguache County Road T is the main road into Crestone. It is a county road. It is "T" in a series of alphabetically named east–west roads that begin at State Highway 112, the south boundary of Saguache County, which would be Road A, if it were not a state highway. Road T is a through road across the valley, crossing U.S. Highway 285 at Swede's Corners about 6 miles south of Saguache, Colorado but is paved only from Moffat, Colorado east 12.5 miles to Crestone, Colorado. The eastern portion of Road T forms the north boundary of the Baca National Wildlife Refuge.

=== Public lands ===
Mountain terrain east of Crestone is managed by the Rio Grande National Forest including part of the Sangre de Cristo Wilderness. Public lands at the foot of the mountains including the forested public land surrounding Crestone are managed by the United States Bureau of Land Management. The combined office of the United States Forest Service and the BLM is in Saguache, Colorado, the county seat.

=== Climate ===
Climate data for Crestone, Colorado (1991–2020 normals, extremes 1982–present)
Month	Jan	Feb	Mar	Apr	May	Jun	Jul	Aug	Sep	Oct	Nov	Dec	Year
Record high °F (°C)	59 (15)	65 (18)	74 (23)	80 (27)	96 (36)	95 (35)	98 (37)	93 (34)	90 (32)	82 (28)	68 (20)	59 (15)	98 (37)
Mean maximum °F (°C)	47.2 (8.4)	52.0 (11.1)	64.8 (18.2)	72.5 (22.5)	81.0 (27.2)	89.2 (31.8)	91.3 (32.9)	87.9 (31.1)	83.6 (28.7)	75.0 (23.9)	60.4 (15.8)	49.3 (9.6)	92.2 (33.4)
Mean daily maximum °F (°C)	33.0 (0.6)	38.5 (3.6)	48.8 (9.3)	56.6 (13.7)	66.5 (19.2)	77.6 (25.3)	81.5 (27.5)	78.7 (25.9)	71.9 (22.2)	59.7 (15.4)	44.8 (7.1)	33.4 (0.8)	57.6 (14.2)
Daily mean °F (°C)	21.1 (−6.1)	26.6 (−3.0)	35.5 (1.9)	42.3 (5.7)	51.4 (10.8)	61.4 (16.3)	65.5 (18.6)	63.4 (17.4)	56.7 (13.7)	45.2 (7.3)	32.1 (0.1)	21.5 (−5.8)	43.6 (6.4)
Mean daily minimum °F (°C)	9.2 (−12.7)	14.7 (−9.6)	22.3 (−5.4)	28.0 (−2.2)	36.2 (2.3)	45.1 (7.3)	49.6 (9.8)	48.1 (8.9)	41.5 (5.3)	30.7 (−0.7)	19.3 (−7.1)	9.7 (−12.4)	29.5 (−1.4)
Mean minimum °F (°C)	−6.3 (−21.3)	−2.6 (−19.2)	5.4 (−14.8)	14.1 (−9.9)	23.6 (−4.7)	33.7 (0.9)	42.1 (5.6)	40.7 (4.8)	29.1 (−1.6)	14.1 (−9.9)	2.2 (−16.6)	−6.6 (−21.4)	−9.9 (−23.3)
Record low °F (°C)	−20 (−29)	−22 (−30)	−10 (−23)	6 (−14)	13 (−11)	24 (−4)	34 (1)	34 (1)	18 (−8)	0 (−18)	−11 (−24)	−18 (−28)	−22 (−30)
Average precipitation inches (mm)	0.50 (13)	0.48 (12)	0.99 (25)	1.07 (27)	1.15 (29)	0.83 (21)	2.11 (54)	1.91 (49)	1.24 (31)	0.91 (23)	0.66 (17)	0.58 (15)	12.43 (316)
Average snowfall inches (cm)	8.0 (20)	7.7 (20)	9.3 (24)	10.8 (27)	2.5 (6.4)	0.0 (0.0)	0.0 (0.0)	0.0 (0.0)	0.0 (0.0)	3.9 (9.9)	7.0 (18)	9.4 (24)	58.6 (149)
Average precipitation days (≥ 0.01 in)	5.2	5.4	6.3	6.6	7.6	5.9	13.0	12.4	8.0	5.7	4.5	5.6	86.2
Average snowy days (≥ 0.1 in)	5.6	5.6	5.7	4.3	1.3	0.0	0.0	0.0	0.0	1.6	3.6	6.1	33.8
Source: NOAA

== Demographics ==
Historical population
Census	Pop.	Note	%±
1910	231		—
1920	74		−68.0%
1930	86		16.2%
1940	172		100.0%
1950	72		−58.1%
1960	51		−29.2%
1970	34		−33.3%
1980	54		58.8%
1990	39		−27.8%
2000	73		87.2%
2010	127		74.0%
2020	141		11.0%
U.S. Decennial Census

The following is derived from the US census and covers only the town itself, thus giving only a partial picture of the area. About half of the homes in Crestone itself are used only on a seasonal basis. The Crestone community is much larger, consisting also of several hundred homes in the Baca Grande subdivision, the surrounding rural area, and the small town of Moffat, Colorado. The Moffat School District No. 2 operates a public school in Moffat and the Crestone Charter School in Crestone.

As of the census of 2000, there were 73 people, 45 households, and 18 families residing in the town. The population density was 290.8 inhabitants per square mile (112.3/km^{2}). There were 79 housing units at an average density of 314.7 units per square mile (121.5 units/km^{2}). The racial makeup of the town was 95.9% White, 4.1% from other races. 1.4% of the population were Hispanic or Latino of any race.

There were 45 households, out of which 8.9% had children under the age of 18 living with them, 28.9% were married couples living together, 4.4% had a female householder with no husband present, and 60.0% don't fit into the above categories. 48.9% of all households were made up of individuals, and 6.7% had someone living alone who was 65 years of age or older. The average household size was 1.62 and the average family size was 2.22.

In the town, the population was spread out, with 8.2% under the age of 18, 4.1% from 18 to 24, 23.3% from 25 to 44, 45.2% from 45 to 64, and 19.2% who were 65 years of age or older. The median age was 52 years. For every 100 females there were 102.8 males. For every 100 females age 18 and over, there were 103.0 males.

The median income for a household in the town was $31,250, and the median income for a family was $40,000. Males had a median income of $22,813 versus $27,917 for females. The per capita income for the town was $22,291. There were 18.8% of families and 19.7% of the population living below the poverty line, including no under eighteens and none of those over 64.

== Gallery ==
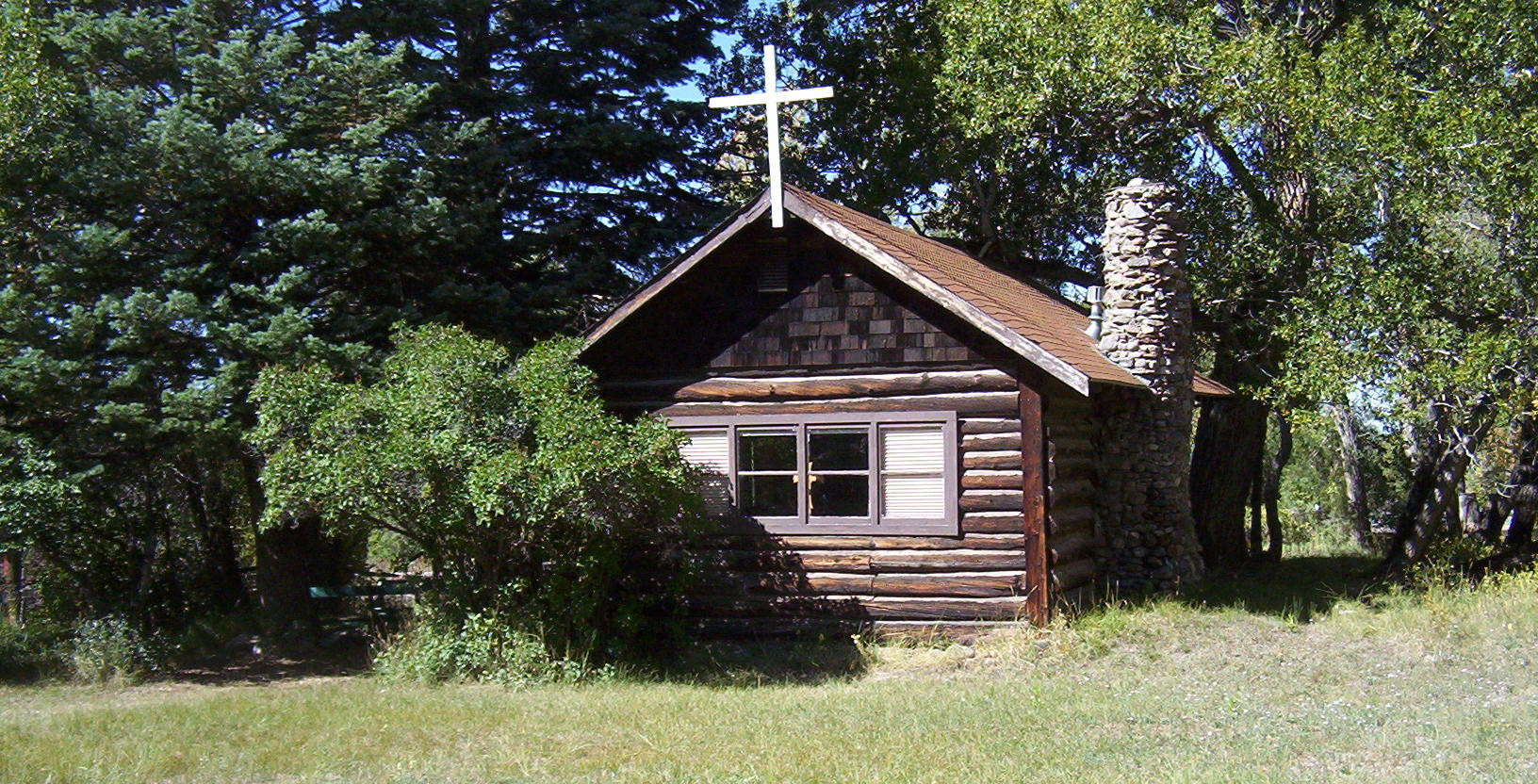
Little Shepherd of the Hills Episcopal Mission

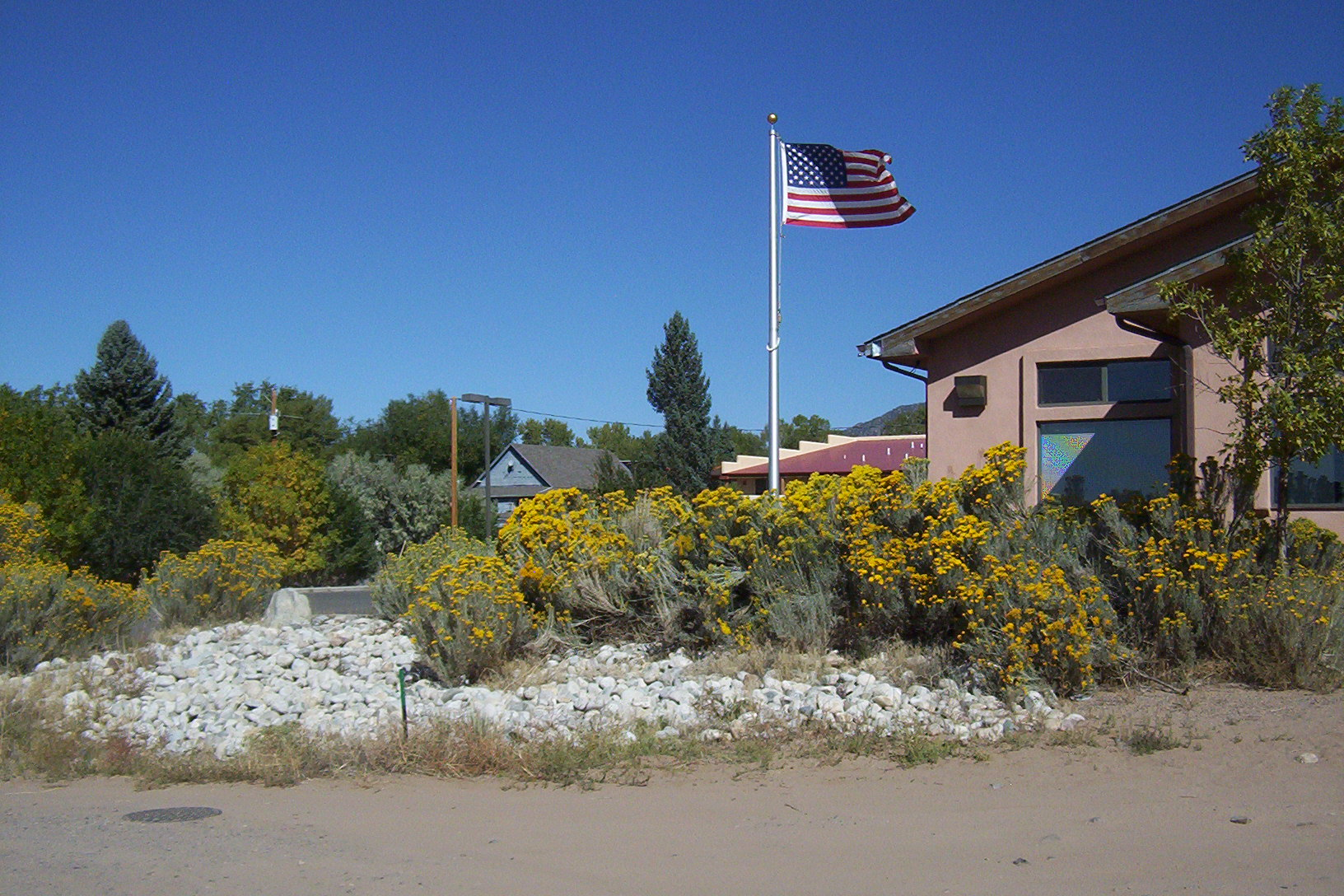
Crestone post office

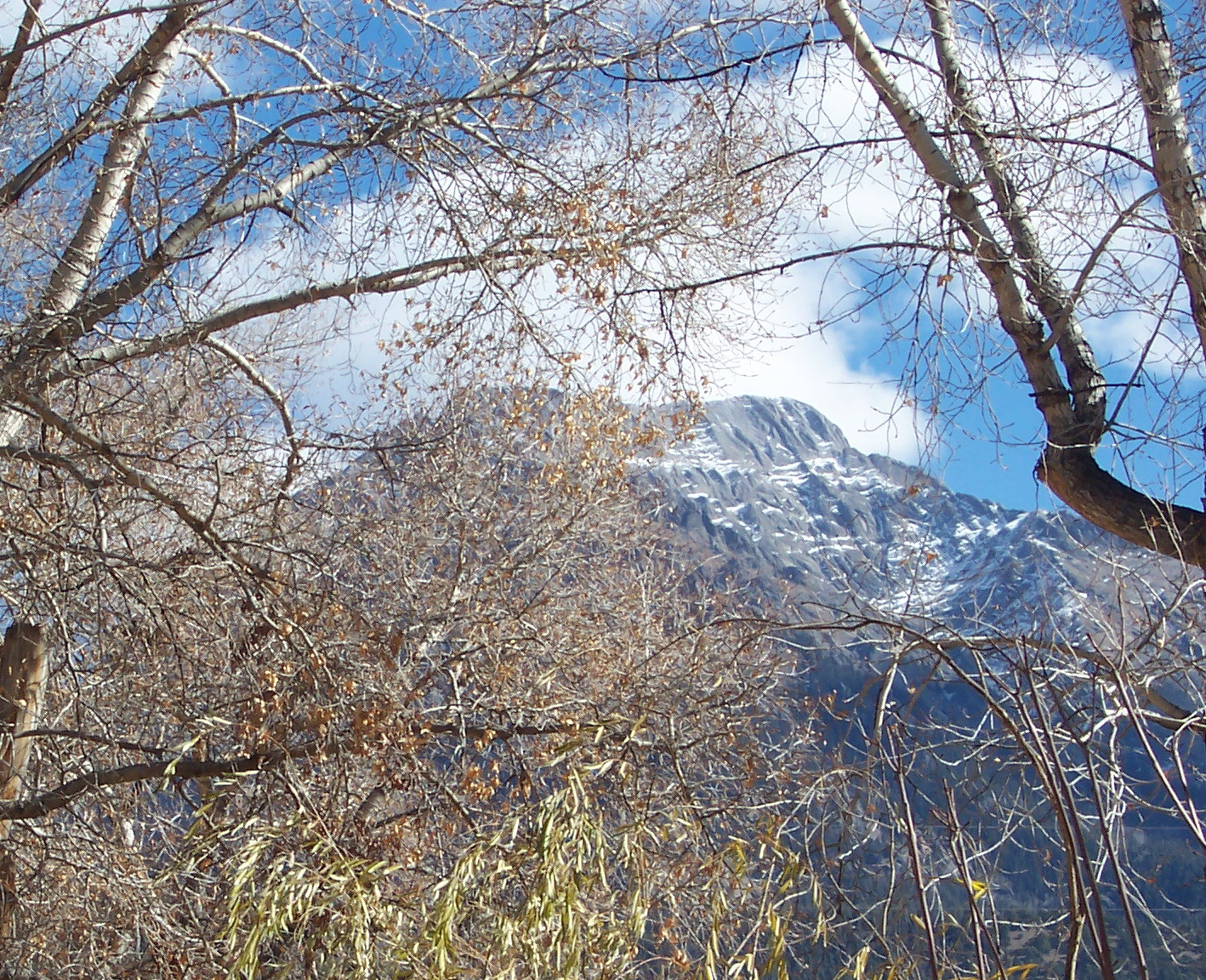
Kit Carson Mountain from Crestone in November 2010

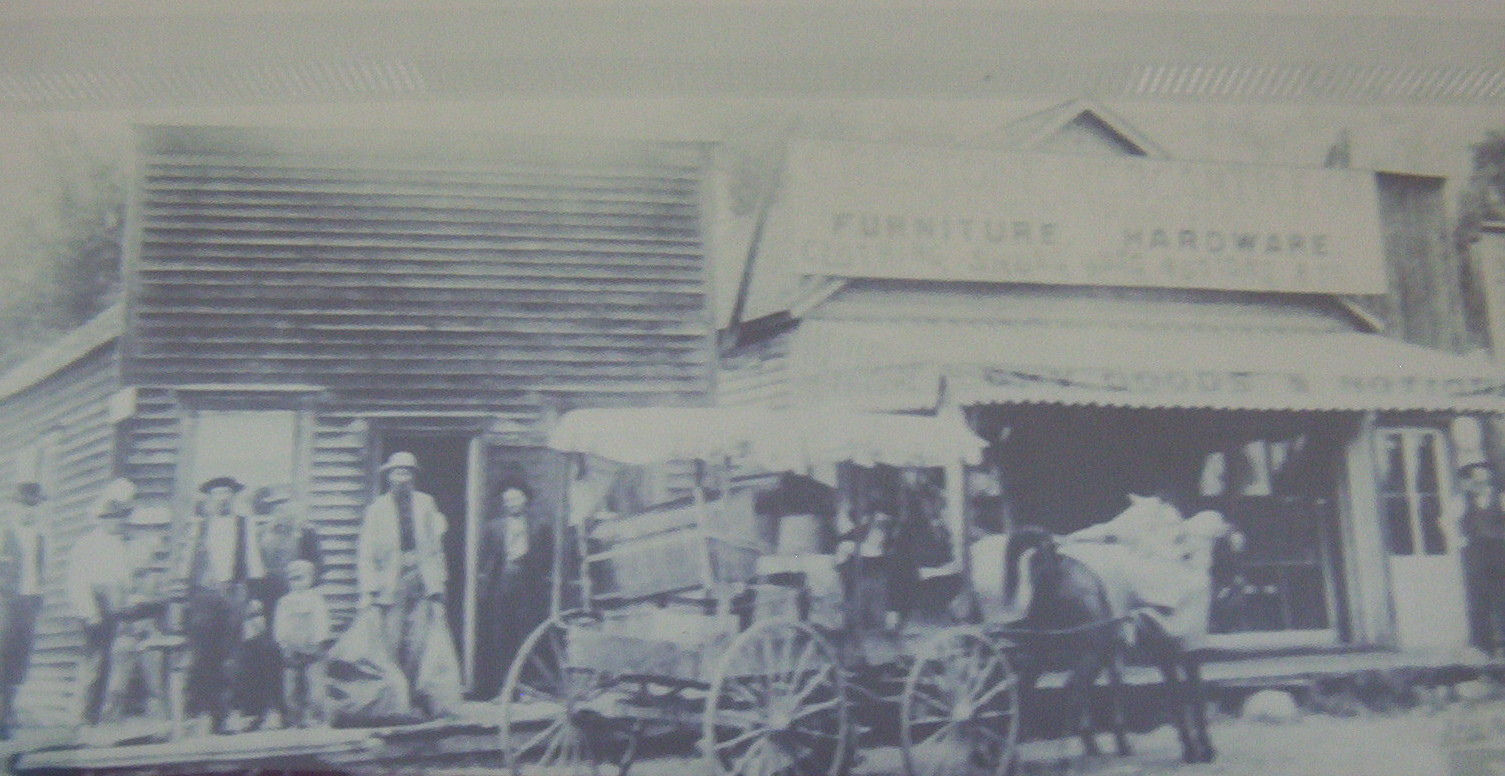
Galena Avenue about 1910

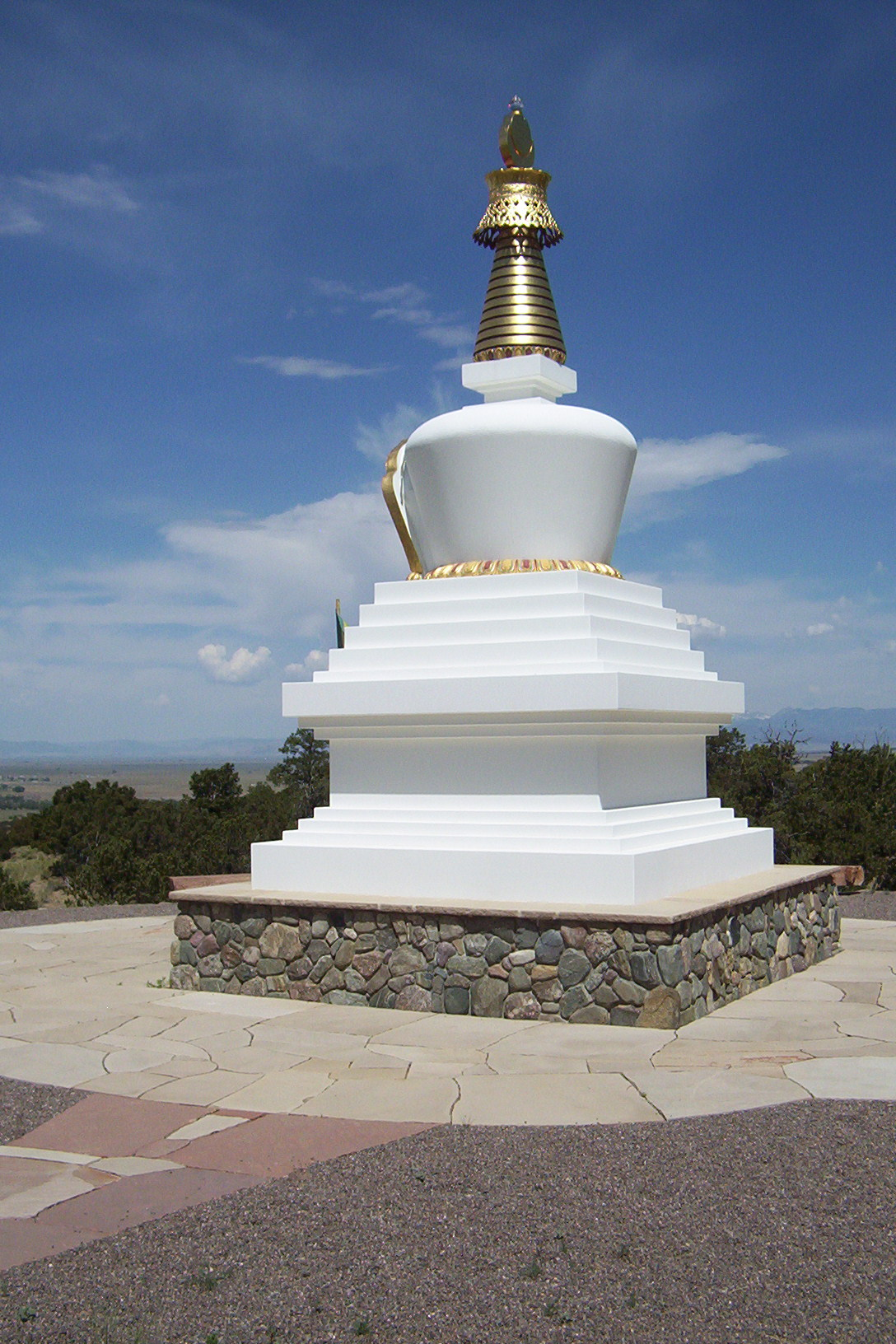
Chorten near Crestone

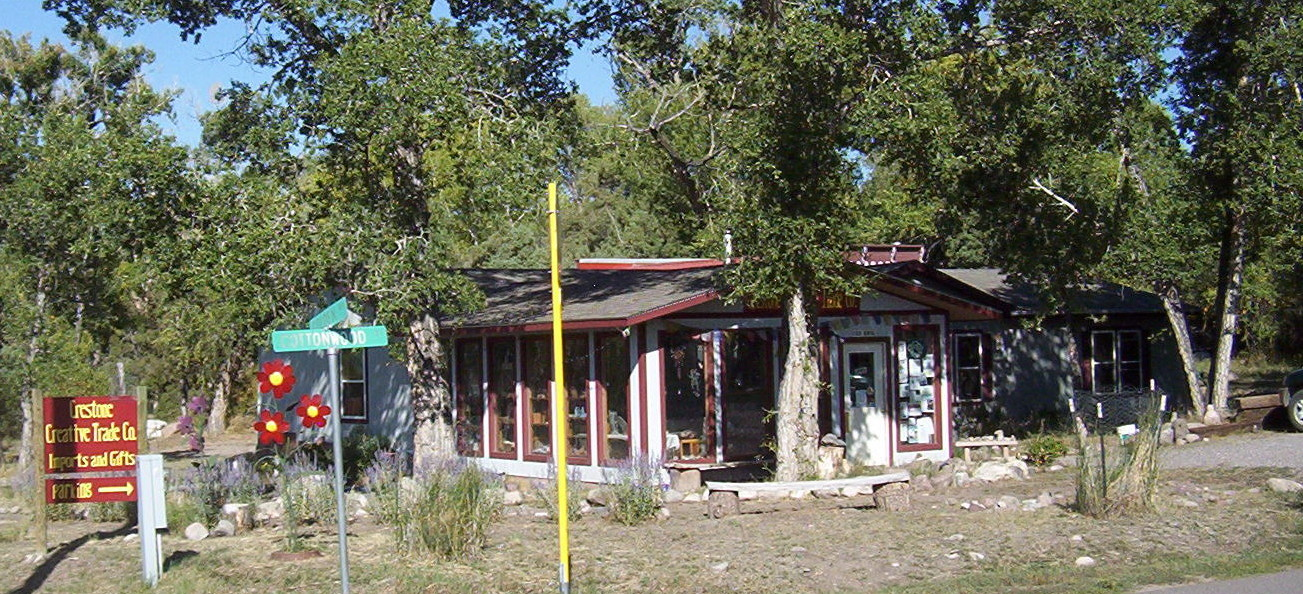
Creative Trade, a gift shop

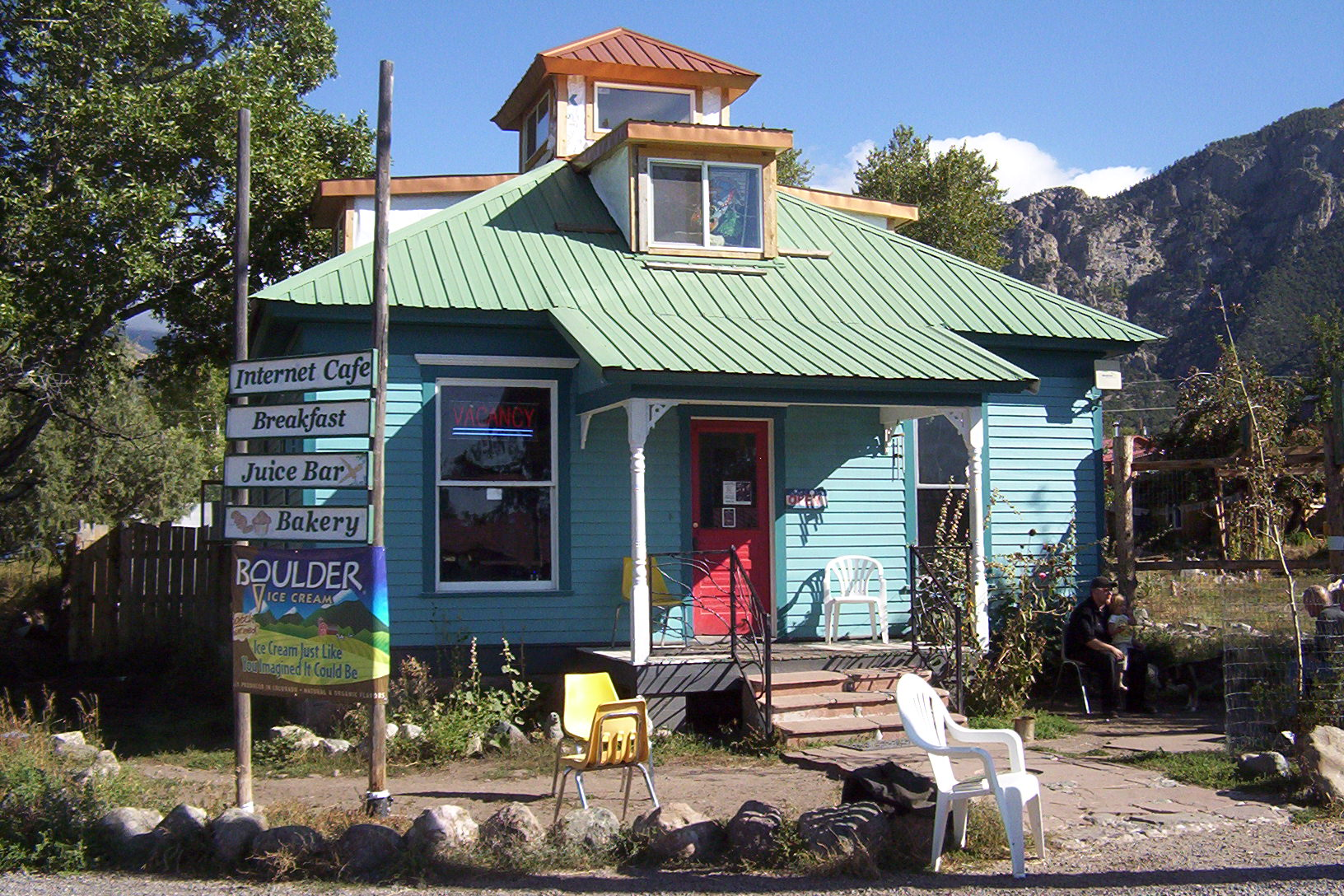
Shambala when it was a cafe

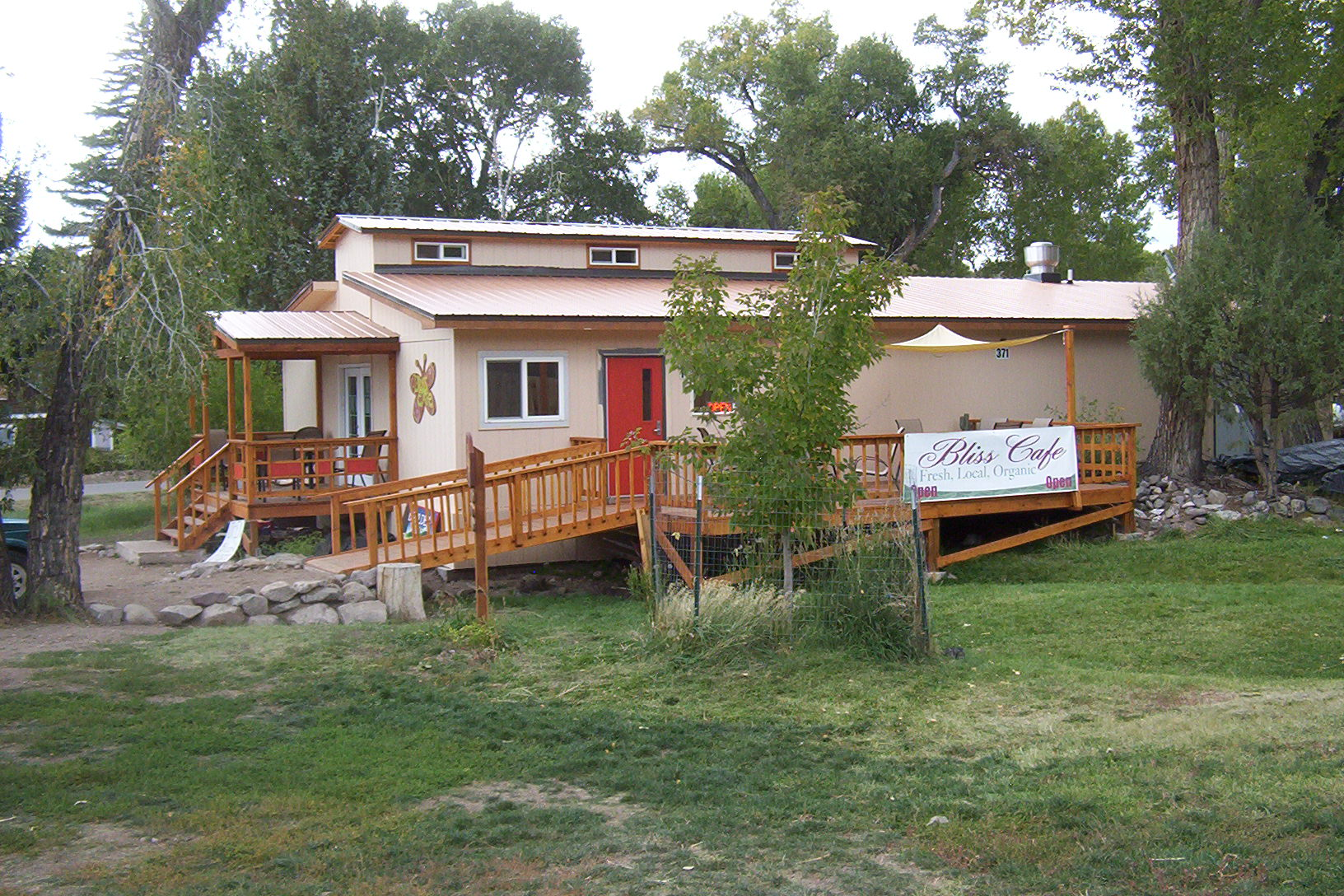
The Bliss Cafe, now repurposed as the Crestone Brewery has since closed.

== Spiritual and intellectual centers ==
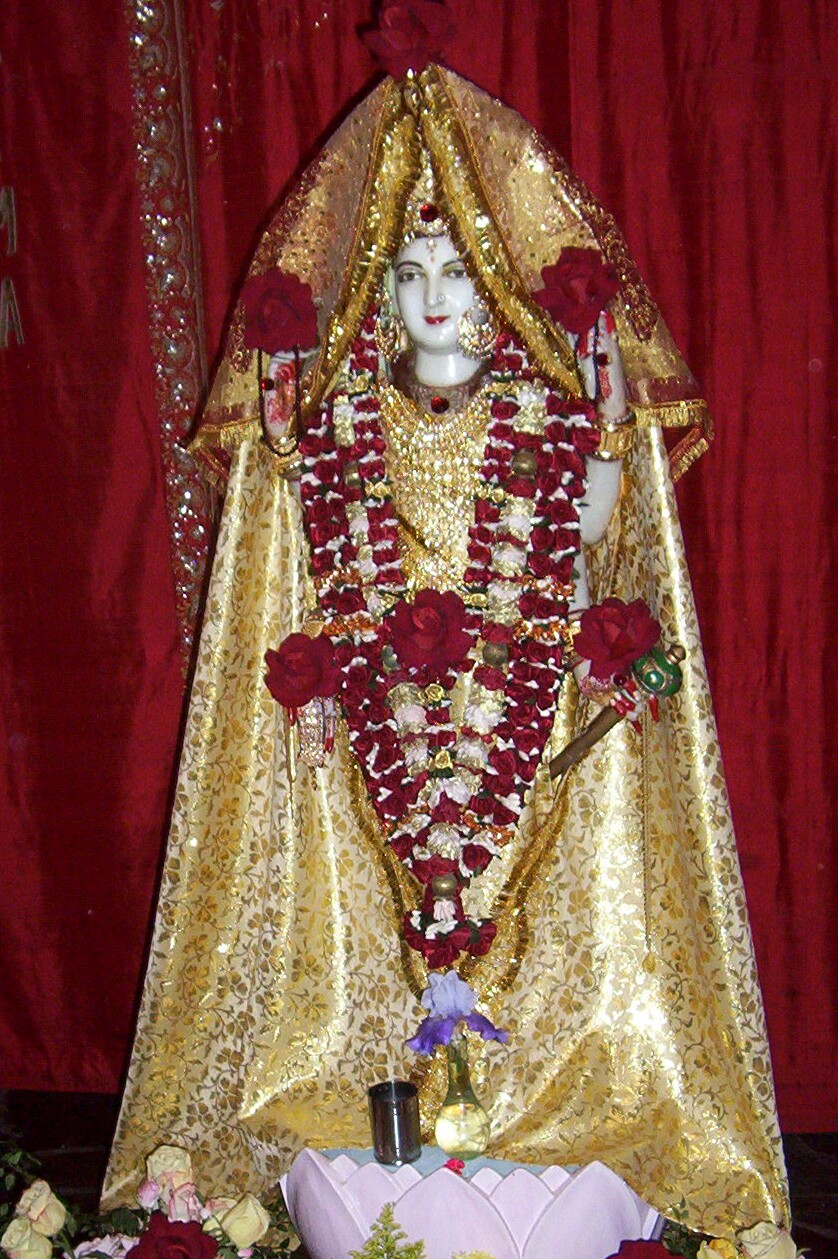
The deity Haidakhandeshwari in the temple of the Haidakhandi Universal Ashram near Crestone

Crestone has become internationally known as a locus for a diverse range of religious and spiritual traditions. Accommodating of spiritual pilgrims and eco-tourists is the major industry in Crestone. The town's development as a spiritual and intellectual center was initiated by Maurice Strong, a multimillionaire businessman and United Nations Undersecretary, and his wife, Hanne Marstrand Strong. Using land acquired from the corporations Strong controlled, they established the Manitou Foundation and Manitou Institute. According to its website, the institute "provides grants and some financial support in Crestone/Baca, Colorado to qualified religious and spiritual projects." The foundation granted land in the area to several spiritual and intellectual centers.

Crestone is one of only a handful of places in the United States where open-air funeral pyres are legally permitted. Since 1998, over 75 individuals have been cremated on an open-air pyre in Crestone.

Spiritual centers in Crestone:

Religion	Organization	Sect
Buddhist (Zen)	Crestone Mountain Zen Center founded by Zentatsu Richard Baker	Sōtō
Buddhist (Tibetan)	Dharma Ocean Retreat Center founded by Reginald Ray	Karma Kagyu
Buddhist (Tibetan)	Karma Thegsum Tashi Gomang founded by the 16th Karmapa	Karma Kagyu
Buddhist (Tibetan)	Mangala Shri Bhuti founded by Dzigar Kongtrul Rinpoche	Nyingma
Buddhist (Tibetan)	Vajra Vidya founded by Thrangu Rinpoche	Karma Kagyu
Buddhist (Tibetan)	Yeshe Khorlo founded by Gangteng Tulku Rinpoche	Nyingma
Buddhist (Tibetan)	Yeshe Rangsal Retreat Center founded by Tsokyni Rinpoche	Drukpa Kagyu
Hindu	Haidakhandi Universal Ashram	Haidakhan Babaji
Hindu	Sri Aurobindo Learning Center	Sri Aurobindo
Hindu	Temple of Consciousness Ashram	Humanity in Unity
Other	Academy of On	Academy of On
Other	Chamma Ling founded by Tenzin Wangyal Rinpoche	Bön
Other	Center for Contemplative Research	Interfaith
Other	The Shumei International Institute in Crestone Colorado	Shumei International Institute

Intellectual and spiritual centers of historical interest:

Nature of organization	Organization	Type of organization
Nonprofit organization	Manitou Foundation and Manitou Institute	
New age think tank	Lindisfarne Association	New Age
Liberal think tank	Aspen Institute	
Liberal arts college	Baca Campus of Colorado College	
Christian	The Spiritual Life Institute and Nada Hermitage Retreat Center	Roman Catholic (Carmelite)
Primary and Secondary	The Crestone Charter School	Charter School
The Church Ministry of Mother of All Creation	Love Has Won	

== Volunteer and community services ==
Emergency services for the town of Crestone and the Baca Grande are provided by the Crestone Volunteer Fire Dept. and the Baca-Crestone Ambulance Service.

The Crestone End of Life Project provides open-air cremation and end of life support. CEOLP is a non-denominational community-based group promoting informed end-of-life choices and supporting their fulfillment. Cost is modest but is available only to the 1,000 or so people who live in the local community.

== Fairs and markets ==
The Annual Crestone Energy Fair is held in Crestone's town parks annually each fall. The fair features presentations, panels, building demonstrations and activities that focus on innovative, sustainable and regenerative ideas in construction, lifestyle & community. There are also vendor booths offering food and local products. Crestone hosts an annual Artists Open Studio Tour during the first weekend in October, allowing for visits to the many artist's studios in the area. Food and local products are offered regularly at the Saturday Market which happens in the middle of town in Little Pearl Park every Saturday during the summer. Crestone has a free box which is enthusiastically supported by the community.

== Wildlife ==
Crestone has historically been a deer park; Mule deer are commonly seen grazing in yards in town. Black bears are common, but usually only at night when they raid garbage cans, dumpsters and other areas where people leave food accessible to them. Bears in this town have been known to break into cars and even peoples homes when windows are left open. In 2011 a bear with two cubs was frequently seen during the day. This bear, which was generally well-behaved other than raiding trash, was killed by the Colorado Department of Natural Resources following a bear attack on a tethered goat. Local sympathizers complained bitterly the wrong bear had been killed, receiving extensive coverage through Channel 9 in Denver which was distributed nationally by the Associated Press, prompting an investigation of the incident by the Division of Parks and Wildlife and possible re-evaluation of management of bears in mixed rural-urban communities such as Crestone. An internal investigation by the Division of Parks and Wildlife came to the conclusion that the right bear had been shot.

== See also ==
- List of municipalities in Colorado
