= GlobeScan =

Global advisory consultancy

GlobeScan Inc.
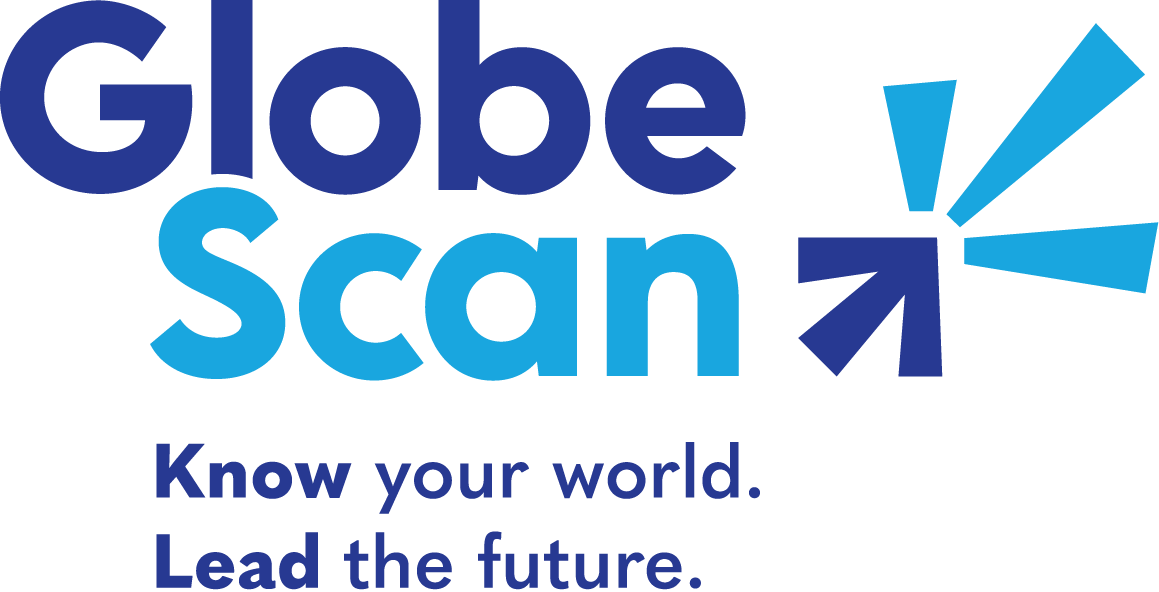
- Type: Private/Independent
- Industry: Management consulting
- Founded: 1987
- Headquarters: Toronto, Canada
- Key people: Chris Coulter, CEO

GlobeScan is a global insights and advisory consultancy. GlobeScan's evidence-based approach generally relies on polling amongst the general public and targeted stakeholders according to the scope of their clients project. Since July 2004, GlobeScan has been a signatory to the United Nations Global Compact and is certified to the ISO 9001:2008 standard. GlobeScan adheres to the professional opinion research standards of ESOMAR in all its research assignments. GlobeScan has offices in London, San Francisco and Toronto, and a network of research partners spanning more than 70 countries.

== Background ==
According to the firm's Chairman and CEO, Doug Miller, its methodology is based on the principles in James Surowiecki's 2004 book The Wisdom of Crowds. Specializing in custom and syndicated research for global companies, non-governmental organizations, and other multilateral institutions, the company has been providing strategic research and counsel to clients around the world since 1987. Its research has been mentioned by numerous media agencies such as Christian Science Monitor, Financial Times, BBC, The Economist, GreenBiz, and The Independent

== Services ==
GlobeScan provides evidence-led counsel to a wide range of organizations seeking to understand and engage with their varied stakeholders, and to adopt or refine strategies on brand, reputation, and sustainability. While much of their work is proprietary, GlobeScan's website shares case studies of work they conducted for a variety of organizations, including SABMiller, ADB, Rio Tinto, National Geographic Society, BSR, PepsiCo, IDRC, BBC World Service, and Amnesty International.

== Notable projects ==
In March 2012, GlobeScan and partner SustainAbility launched The Regeneration Roadmap—a collaborative and multi-faceted initiative that aims to provide a road map for achieving sustainable development within the next generation, focusing in particular on ways the private sector can improve sustainability strategy, increase credibility and deliver results at greater speed and scale. The project is sponsored in part by BMW, SC Johnson, DuPont, Pfizer, Interface, and media partner The Guardian Sustainable Business. A major component of the project is a series of sustainability pioneer interviews, dubbed "The Ray Anderson Memorial Interviews". It is a series of interviews with 20 sustainable development pioneers from business, government and civil society, notable for their long term commitment to sustainable development. Some participants include Madame Gro Harlem Brundtland, Lester Brown, Nitin Desai, Maurice Strong, David Suzuki, Yolanda Kakabadse, Sha Zukang, Sir Mark Moody-Stuart, Achim Steiner, Vandana Shiva, Jim MacNeill, and Bill Ford.

In April 2012, GlobeScan worked with Unilever to deliver a 24-hour, online conference around the launch of Unilever's Sustainable Living Plan. Dubbed "The Sustainable Living Lab", the objective was to create and inspire a dialogue where Unilever could learn from sustainability leaders to co-create leading edge ideas and share good practice which would help Unilever and others make more progress on the big sustainability challenges that face the world.

The firm is known for its "Greendex", which is a study measuring and monitoring consumer progress toward environmental sustainability conducted in 2008, 2009, and 2010 in partnership with the National Geographic Society. The project looked at 14,000+ consumers in Australia, Brazil, Canada, China, France, Germany, Great Britain, Hungary, India, Japan, Mexico, Russia, Spain, and the United States. It also consulted 27 international experts in sustainability. In all three years it ran (2008, 2009, and 2010) the United States placed dead last with Canada next to last.

The firm also attracted international media attention for its 2008 worldwide survey that matched presidential candidates Barack Obama with John McCain, questioning 23,531 people either face-to-face or via telephone in 22 countries. The poll found strong preference for Obama. However, about 4 in 10 surveyed did not express an opinion. Doug Miller has said that "[l]arge numbers of people around the world clearly like what Barack Obama represents". He also commented that America's international image was mostly negative at that time.

== Clients ==
According to their website, GlobeScan's list of clients includes:

Amnesty International	Goldman Sachs	Philips
Anglo American	Hewlett-Packard	Procter & Gamble
Astra Zeneca	Kraft Foods	Rio Tinto
Barclays	Maersk	Royal Dutch Shell
BBC World Service	McDonald's	SABMiller
BHP Billiton	National Geographic Society	Siemens
BMW	Nestle	Toyota
BP	Nike	Unilever
Cisco	Novartis	Volkswagen
Citigroup	Oxfam	Walt Disney Company
Dell	PepsiCo	Warner Brothers
Fairtrade International	Pfizer	World Bank
