= Public Opinion Poll Center =

Government public opinion center in Egypt

The Public Opinion Poll Center (POPC) is one of Egypt's polling centers and is the first center in Egypt as well as the Arab world to use telephones as a data collection tool. Affiliated to the Cabinet's Information and Decision Support Center (IDSC), the POPC was established in 2003, as the first poll center in Egypt responsible for studying trends of Egyptian public opinion towards different internal social, political and economic affairs. Such trends are forwarded to decision makers to use them in the preparation of different plans and policies. The POPC also measures public opinion preferences in order to understand priority issues and put them on the priority list of decision makers.

The POPC aims to provide accurate and fast measurement of Egyptian public opinion trends in a way that helps decision makers take accurate decisions. The POPC tries to reinforce the role of polls in supporting decision makers and achieving comprehensive development, strengthening the bond between the government and the people and building a social culture that accepts the idea of public opinion polling and encouraging positive participation.

The POPC depend on telephones in their data collection process. A data base compromising ten millions publicly listed landline telephone numbers is used. Telephones have been proven to be less costly and time and effort saving. A uni-stage stratified sample is designed for Egyptian households in different governorates after being divided into three areas: urban governorates, Upper Egypt and Lower Egypt. Relative weights are then given to each area according to their actual representation in society. Sample size used by the POPC ranges from 1 to 2 thousand, depending on the nature of the poll. A factor analysis method is used to calculate the economic class of households, depending on the ownership of certain possessions, and dividing them into three economic classes: low, middle and high.

An Electronic Poll Management System has been used by the POPC since 2006. This system is considered as one of the pioneer systems in the field of public opinion poll management in the Middle East due to its high capabilities in completely automating the work flow. The EMS is the first Arab professional effort done to provide an integrated surveying solution based on the use of the latest technologies and supported by theoretical and scientific standards and specifications.

Polls conducted by the POPC cover a wide range of topics, particularly pertaining to economic, social and political matters. Polls conducted include subsidies, healthcare, investment, education, unemployment, the job market, political participation, political amendments, women's participation in political life, role of women in society, and many others.

The Public Opinion Poll Center has many national, regional and international partners. On the international level, POPC has previously conducted polls in cooperation with the UNDP, WTO, Globescan, and several others. On the national level, POPC works with all different ministries, government institutions such as the Social Fund for Development (SFD) and National Council for Childhood and Motherhood (NCCM), as well as local and research centers and national councils.
