= Brundtland Commission =

UN sustainable development sub-organization

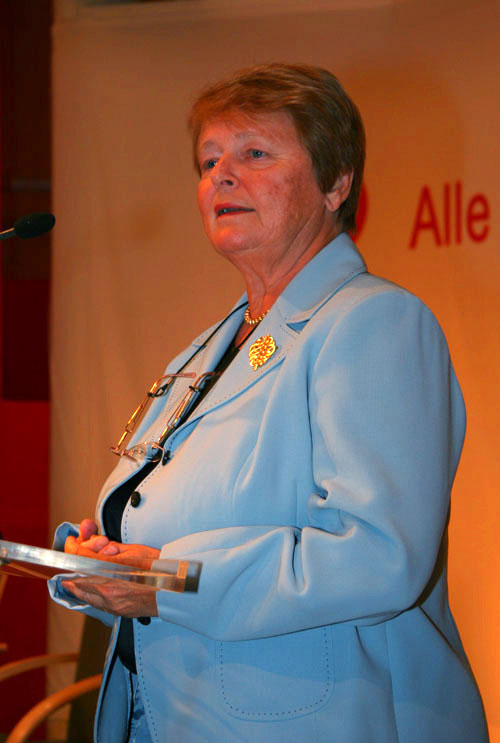
Gro Harlem Brundtland, first head of the commission.

The Brundtland Commission, formally the World Commission on Environment and Development, was a sub-organization of the United Nations (UN) that aimed to unite countries in pursuit of sustainable development. It was founded in 1983 when Javier Pérez de Cuéllar, the Secretary-General of the United Nations, appointed Gro Harlem Brundtland, former Prime Minister of Norway, as chairperson of the commission. Brundtland was chosen due to her strong background in the sciences and public health.

The Brundtland Commission officially dissolved in 1987 after releasing Our Common Future, also known as the Brundtland Report. The document popularized the term "sustainable development" and won the Grawemeyer Award in 1991. In 1988, the Center for Our Common Future replaced the commission.

== History ==
=== Before Brundtland ===
Ten years after the 1972 United Nations Conference on the Human Environment, a number of global environmental challenges had not been adequately addressed.

During the 1980s, the World Bank increasingly intervened with the economic and social policies of the Third World, most notably with the events at Bretton Woods in 1945. Neoliberalism and economic globalization dominated the political agenda of leading trading nations, led by the US's Ronald Reagan and the UK's Margaret Thatcher.

The underlying problem was reducing poverty in low-income countries without exacerbating global and local environmental burdens. Neither high-income Northern countries nor low-income Southern countries were willing to give up economic growth, but environmental threats such as pollution, acid rain, deforestation, desertification, and ozone depletion were impossible to overlook. Countries needed some way to reconcile economic development with environmental protection.

Views differed on several questions:

- Were local environmental problems the result of local developments or of a global economic system that forced low-income countries to destroy their environment?
- Did environmental burdens result from destructive economic growth or a lack of economic development?
- Would reconciling the economy and the environment require more resource-efficient technologies (for example), or social, political, and structural changes?

The 1980 World Conservation Strategy of the International Union for Conservation of Nature was the first report that included a very brief chapter on a concept called "sustainable development". It focused on global structural changes and was not widely read. The UN created an independent commission, which was asked to provide an analysis of existing problems and ideas for solving them, similar to earlier commissions such as the Independent Commission on International Development Issues (Brandt Commission) and the Independent Commission on Disarmament and Security Issues (Palme Commission).

=== Establishment ===
In December 1983, the Secretary-General of the United Nations, Javier Pérez de Cuéllar, asked the former Prime Minister of Norway, Gro Harlem Brundtland, to create an organization independent of the UN to focus on environmental and developmental problems and solutions after an affirmation by the General Assembly resolution in the fall of 1983. This new organization was the Brundtland Commission, formally known as the World Commission on Environment and Development. It was initially headed by Brundtland as Chairman and Mansour Khalid as Vice-Chairman.

The 1983 General Assembly established the Commission with Resolution 38/161, "Process of Preparation of the Environmental Perspective to the Year 2000 and Beyond". In A/RES/38/161, the General Assembly:

8. Suggests that the Special Commission, when established, should focus mainly on the following terms of reference for its work:
(a) To propose long-term environmental strategies for achieving sustainable development to the year 2000 and beyond;
(b) To recommend ways in which concern for the environment may be translated into greater cooperation among developing countries and between countries at different stages of economic and social development and lead to the achievement of common and mutually supportive objectives which take account of the interrelationships between people, resources, environment, and development;
(c) To consider ways and means by which the international community can deal more effectively with environmental concerns, in the light of the other recommendations in its report;
(d) To help define shared perceptions of long-term environmental issues and of the appropriate efforts needed to deal successfully with the problems of protecting and enhancing the environment, a long-term agenda for action during the coming decades, and aspirational goals for the world community, taking into account the relevant resolutions of the session of a special character of the Governing Council in 1982;

== Definition of sustainable development ==
The Brundtland Report was intended to respond to the conflict between globalized economic growth and accelerating ecological degradation by redefining "economic development" in terms of "sustainable development". It is credited with crafting the most prevalent definition of sustainability:

"Sustainable development is development that meets the needs of the present without compromising the ability of future generations to meet their own needs."

=== Development ===
Our Common Future was published by Oxford University Press in 1987. The document was the culmination of a “900-day” international exercise which catalogued, analyzed, and synthesized written submissions and expert testimony from “senior government representatives, scientists and experts, research institutes, industrialists, representatives of non-governmental organizations, and the general public” held at public hearings throughout the world.

The Brundtland Commission's mandate was to:

“[1] re-examine the critical issues of environment and development and to formulate innovative, concrete, and realistic action proposals to deal with them; [2] strengthen international cooperation on environment and development and assess and propose new forms of cooperation that can break out of existing patterns and influence policies and events in the direction of needed change; and [3] raise the level of understanding and commitment to action on the part of individuals, voluntary organizations, businesses, institutes, and governments” (1987: 347).

Furthermore,

“The Commission has focused its attention on the areas of population, food security, the loss of species and genetic resources, energy, industry, and human settlements - realizing that all of these are connected and cannot be treated in isolation one from another” (1987: 27).

=== Analysis ===
The commission's definition contains two main elements:

- the concept of "needs", in particular those of the global poor, to which overriding priority should be given
- limitations imposed by the technology and social organization on the environment's ability to meet present and future needs

These ideas are essentially equivalent to intergenerational equity; "needs" are basic and essential, economic growth will facilitate their fulfilment, and equity is encouraged by citizen participation.

Another key element in the definition is the unity of environment and development. The Brundtland Commission argued against the assertions of the 1972 Stockholm Conference on the Human Environment and provided an alternative perspective on sustainable development, unique from that of the 1980 World Conservation Strategy of the International Union for Conservation of Nature. The commission suggested that while the "environment" was previously perceived as a sphere separate from human emotion or action, and "development" was a term habitually used to describe political goals or economic progress, it is more comprehensive to understand the two terms in relation to each other (i.e., one can better understand the environment in relation to development and vice versa because they cannot and should not be distinguished as separate entities). Brundtland argued:

"...the "environment" is where we live; and "development" is what we all do in attempting to improve our lot within that abode. The two are inseparable."

The Brundtland Commission insisted that the environment should also include social and political atmospheres and circumstances, as well as how development is not just about how poor countries can ameliorate their situation, but what the entire world, including developed countries, can do to ameliorate their common situation.

The Brundtland Commission Report recognized that human resource development in the form of poverty reduction, gender equity, and wealth redistribution was crucial to formulating strategies for environmental conservation and that environmental limits to economic growth in industrialized and industrializing societies existed. The report offered “the analysis, the broad remedies, and the recommendations for a sustainable course of development” within such societies.

=== Responses to the definition ===
The Brundtland definition is open to interpretation, allowing for widespread support from diverse efforts, groups and organizations, and has also been criticized for being "self-defeating and compromised rhetoric". Despite this, the issue of sustainable development entered the agenda of international and national institutions, corporations, and cities.

== Structure ==
The Brundtland Commission was chaired by former Norwegian prime minister Gro Harlem Brundtland. Politicians, civil servants, and environmental experts made up the majority of the members. Members of the commission represented 21 different nations (both developed and developing countries are included). Many of the members were important political figures in their home country, such as William Ruckelshaus, former head of the U.S. Environmental Protection Agency. All members of the commission were appointed by both Brundtland and Khalid.

The commission focused on setting up networks to promote environmental stewardship. Most of these networks make connections between governments and non-government entities, such as Bill Clinton's Council on Sustainable Development, which invites government and business leaders to come together and share ideas on how to encourage sustainable development. The Brundtland Commission has been the most successful in forming international ties between governments and multinational corporations. The international structure and scope of the Brundtland Commission allowed multiple problems (such as deforestation and ozone depletion) to be looked at from a holistic approach.

== Sustainability efforts ==
The three main pillars of sustainable development include economic growth, environmental protection, and social equality. While many people agree that each of these three ideas contributes to the overall idea of sustainability, it is difficult to find evidence of equal levels of initiative for the three pillars in countries' policies worldwide. With the overwhelming number of countries that put economic growth on the forefront of sustainable development, it is evident that the other two pillars have been suffering, especially with the overall well-being of the environment in a dangerously unhealthy state. The Brundtland Commission put forth a conceptual framework that many nations agree with and want to try to make a difference within their countries, but it has been difficult to change these concepts about sustainability into concrete actions and programs. After the commission released Our Common Future, it called for an international meeting to take place to map out more concrete initiatives and goals, which took place in Rio de Janeiro. A comprehensive plan of action, known as Agenda 21, came out of the meeting, and entailed actions to be taken globally, nationally, and locally to make life on Earth more sustainable going into the future.

=== Economic growth ===
Economic growth is the pillar that most groups focus on when attempting to attain more sustainable efforts and development. In trying to build their economies, many countries focus their efforts on resource extraction, which leads to unsustainable efforts for environmental protection and economic growth sustainability. While the commission was able to help to change the association between economic growth and resource extraction, the total worldwide consumption of resources is projected to increase in the future. Agenda 21 reinforces the importance of finding methods to generate economic growth without hurting the environment.

=== Environmental protection ===
Environmental protection has become more important to government and businesses over the last 20 years, leading to great improvements in the number of people willing to invest in green technologies. For the second consecutive year in 2010, the US and Europe added more power capacity from renewable sources such as the wind and sun. In 2011 the efforts continued with 45 new wind energy projects in 25 different states. The focus on environmental protection transpired globally, including a great deal of investment in renewable energy power capacity. Eco-city development occurring around the world helps develop and implement water conservation, smart grids with renewable energy sources, LED street lights, and energy-efficient buildings. The consumption gap remains: "roughly 80 percent of the natural resources used each year are consumed by about 20 percent of the world's population".

=== Social equality ===
Social equality and equity are pillars of sustainable development that focus on the social well-being of people. The growing gap between incomes of the rich and poor is evident throughout the world with the incomes of the richer households increasing relative to the incomes of middle- or lower-class households. The disparity is attributed partly to the land distribution patterns in rural areas where the majority live on land. Global inequality has been declining, but the richest 1% of the world's population owns 40% of the world's wealth and the poorest 50% owns around 1%. The Commission reduced the number of people living on less than a dollar a day to just half of what it used to be, as many can approach the environment and use it. These achievements can also be attributed to economic growth in China and India.

== Members of the commission ==
- Chairman: Gro Harlem Brundtland (Norway)
- Vice Chairman: Mansour Khalid (Sudan)
- Susanna Agnelli (Italy)
- Saleh A. Al-Athel (Saudi Arabia)
- Pablo Gonzalez Casanova (Mexico) (ceased to participate in August 1986 for personal reasons)
- Bernard Chidzero (Zimbabwe)
- Lamine Mohammed Fadika (Côte d'Ivoire)
- Volker Hauff (Federal Republic of Germany)
- István Láng (Hungary)
- Ma Shijun (People's Republic of China)
- Margarita Marino de Botero (Colombia)
- Nagendra Singh (India)
- Paulo Nogueira Neto (Brazil)
- Saburo Okita (Japan)
- Shridath S. Ramphal (Guyana)
- William D. Ruckelshaus (USA)
- Mohamed Sahnoun (Algeria)
- Emil Salim (Indonesia)
- Bukar Shaib (Nigeria)
- Vladimir Sokolov (USSR)
- Janez Stanovnik (Yugoslavia)
- Maurice Strong (Canada)

Ex Officio

- Jim MacNeill (Canada)

== Staff on the commission ==
In May 1984, the commission held an organizational meeting of the Commission in Geneva to adopt its rules of procedure and operation, and to appoint a secretary general to guide its work. In July 1984, a secretariat was established in Geneva, temporarily at the Centre de Morillon and later at the Palais Wilson. Members of the secretariat have included:

- Jim MacNeil, Secretary General
- Nitin Desai, Senior Economic Advisor
- Vitus Fernando, Senior Programme Officer
- Branislav Gosovic, Senior Programme Officer
- Marie-Madeleine Jacquemier, Finance and Administrative Officer
- Kazu Kato, Director of Programmes
- Warren H. Lindner, Secretary of the Commission and Director of Administration
- Elisabeth Monosovski, Senior Programme Officer
- Gustavo Montero, Programme Planning Officer
- Shimwaa'i Muntemba, Senior Programme Officer
- Janos Pasztor, Senior Programme Officer
- Peter Robbs, Senior Public Information Advisor
- Vicente Sanchez, Director of Programmes
- Linda Starke, Editor
- Peter Stone, Director of Information
- Edith Surber, Finance and Administrative Officer
- General services and support staff
  - Brita Baker
  - Elisabeth Bohler-Goodship
  - Marie-Pierre Destouet
  - Marian Doku
  - Tamara Dean Dunn
  - Aud Loen
  - Jelka de Marsano
  - Chedra Mayhew
  - Christel Olleach
  - Ellen Permato
  - Guadalupe Quesada
  - Mildred Raphoz
  - Evelyn Salvador
  - Teresa Harmand
  - Iona D'Souza
  - Kay Streit
  - Vicky Underhill
  - Shane Vanderwert

== See also ==
- Sustainability
- Nuclear power proposed as renewable energy
