= Luis Maria Baca Grant No. 4 =

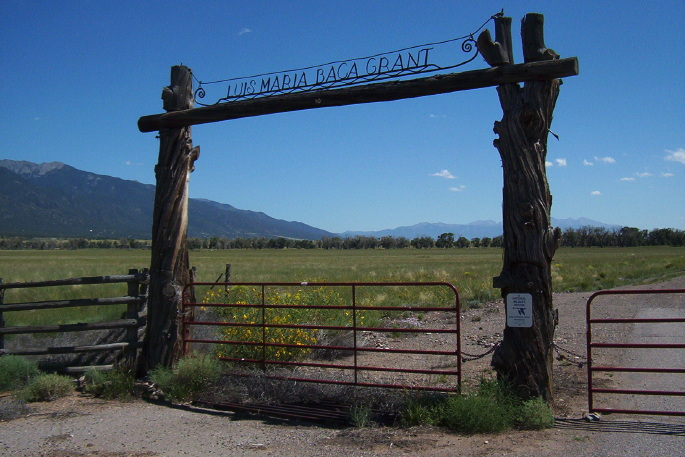
Headquarters gate, August 2007

The Luis Maria Baca Grant No. 4, south of Crestone, Colorado, was a large land grant made in 1860 by the United States to the heirs of the original Vegas Grandes Grant to the Baca family of New Mexico in Las Vegas, New Mexico. Title to the grant in Las Vegas was clouded by a second grant of the same land. The Baca heirs were offered alternative lands from the public lands of the United States. The largest of the tracts selected, near what is now Crestone, was 12.5 miles (20.1 km) on a side and was located to the south of what is now Saguache County Road T, about 1-mile (1.6 km) south of the 38th parallel. The Bacas deeded the land to their attorney, John Sebrie Watts, but it soon passed by tax sale to a third party. The ranch headquarters was on Crestone Creek to the southwest of Crestone. The Baca Grant was one of the first large tracts of land to be fenced in the West and in its heyday was the home of prize Hereford cattle.

In addition to ranching there was some mining in the area to the east and south of Crestone, some on the lands of the grant, but no big strikes. In 1880 the town of Crestone was platted by George Adams, the owner of the Baca Grant. In 1900, with the help of Eastern investors, George Adams ignited a minor boom, reopening one of the more promising mines and building a railroad spur to the town and the mines along the Sangre de Cristo Range south of town. However, lacking good ore, the boom was short-lived. A long period of decline followed.

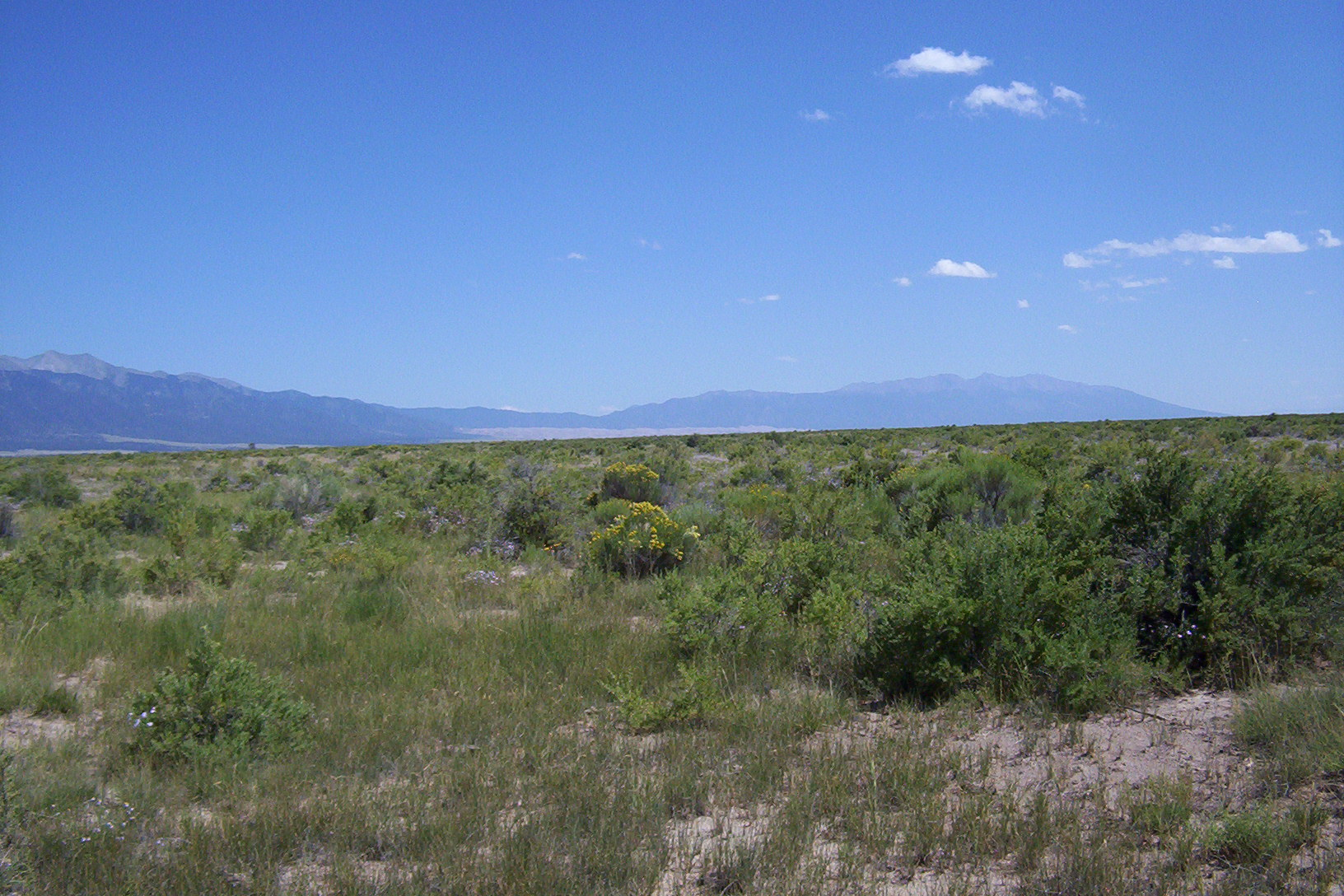
View from the northwestern corner of the original grant, August 2007

By 1948 Crestone had declined to its post-war population of 40 souls, mostly retired folks and cowboys who worked on The Grant, as the Baca Grant was called locally. In 1950 the last private owner of the Grant, Alfred Collins, died. In 1951 the property was sold to the Newhall Land and Farming Company which held it until 1962 when retaining the mineral rights, Newhall sold it to Arizona-Colorado Land and Cattle Company. In 1971 a portion of the Baca Grant, under the corporate ownership of the Arizona-Colorado Land and Cattle Company, immediately south of Crestone, was subdivided, creating the Baca Grande, a subdivision originally platted for about 10,000 lots. At great expense, underground utilities were installed and roads built. However, sales lagged and by 1979 the development was considered a liability by the corporation, then renamed AZL. Maurice Strong, owner of a controlling interest in AZL and his fiancée Hanne Marstrand visited the development and "fell in love with it." The Strongs were inspired to create a world spiritual center and began granting parcels of land to traditional spiritual organizations.

In the late eighties, the remaining lands and waters of the ranch, now termed the "Baca Ranch" or "Baca", were used as a base by the corporate ownership of the ranch, reorganized as "American Water Development, Inc" (AWDI), to make an application in the Colorado Water Courts to develop and export deep underground water to the front range cities of Colorado. The application was vigorously opposed by the local community in the San Luis Valley and met defeat in the Colorado Supreme Court in 1991.

In 1995, with the Baca under new ownership, a new group of investors initiated another water exportation plan. The Stockman's Water plan, as it was known, was the creation of San Luis Valley native Gary Boyce and his Cabeza de Baca company. The Stockman's Water plan was defeated in the Colorado legislature in 1998.

Bankrupt, the lands of the corporation, after sustained litigation, were purchased by the Nature Conservancy and subsequently incorporated into the public lands of the United States, the southern and eastern portions as national forest and the Great Sand Dunes National Park and Preserve and the northern and western portions as the Baca National Wildlife Refuge. The original ranch headquarters and other buildings are on the wildlife refuge. As is usual on federal wildlife refuges, grazing and hay production continue on a limited basis.

== History of the original Las Vegas Grant ==
The history of the grant from a US Forest Service document:

On January 16, 1821, Baca, for himself and his 17 sons, petitioned the provincial deputation of Nueva Vizcaya for the same grant that he had requested originally. Baca and his sons described their requested tract as bounded on the north by the Chapelote River, on the east by the Aguaje de la Yegua and the Antonio Ortíz Grant, on the south by the San Miguel del Vado Land Grant and on the west by the summit of the Pecos Mountains.

On May 29, 1821, the provincial deputation notified the New Mexican colonial governor that the grant had been approved. The Alcalde of San Miguel del Vado was supposed to deliver legal possession of the grant to Baca and his sons, and after considerable delay, he did so in 1826 (U.S. Congress, House 1860). Meanwhile, by the Treaty of Córdoba, signed on August 24, 1821, Mexico won its independence from Spain.

Luis María Cabeza de Baca built a little house on the Gallinas River at the place called Loma Montosa, and ran sheep on the grant. He died in 1827 after being fatally wounded by a soldier in an argument over 13 packs of contraband pelts that belonged to American trapper Ewing Young. His son, Juan Antonio Baca, took on the ranching operation."

The Baca family had begun taking their sheep into the Jémez Mountains during periods when the Navajos refrained from raids. In 1835, however, Navajo raiders suddenly struck. They killed Juan Antonio and stole his sheep.

Because Indian hostilities simultaneously plagued the Gallinas River, Juan Antonio’s heirs did not reoccupy the grant given to Luis María Cabeza de Baca. After the Town of Las Vegas received its grant in 1835, Francisco Tomás Baca, son and executor of Juan Antonio Baca and one of Luis María’s many grandsons, protested to Governor Armijo that the Town of Las Vegas Grant covered the same lands as the Baca Land Grant, but Armijo took no action.

Action under the Treaty of Guadalupe Hidalgo:

New Mexico Surveyor General Pelham conducted a hearing on the Baca and Town of Las Vegas Grant applications. He recommended to Congress in 1860 that both grants be confirmed, leaving it to the courts to try to determine the rights of two parties (U.S. Congress, House 1860). To avoid litigation, the Baca heirs offered to give up their claim, provided they got an equivalent amount of land somewhere else in the New Mexican Territory. Congress approved an act on June 21, 1860, confirming the Town of Las Vegas Grant and authorizing the heirs of Luis María Cabeza de Vaca [sic] to select vacant lands in "square bodies, not exceeding five in number" (U.S. Public Law 167 1860).

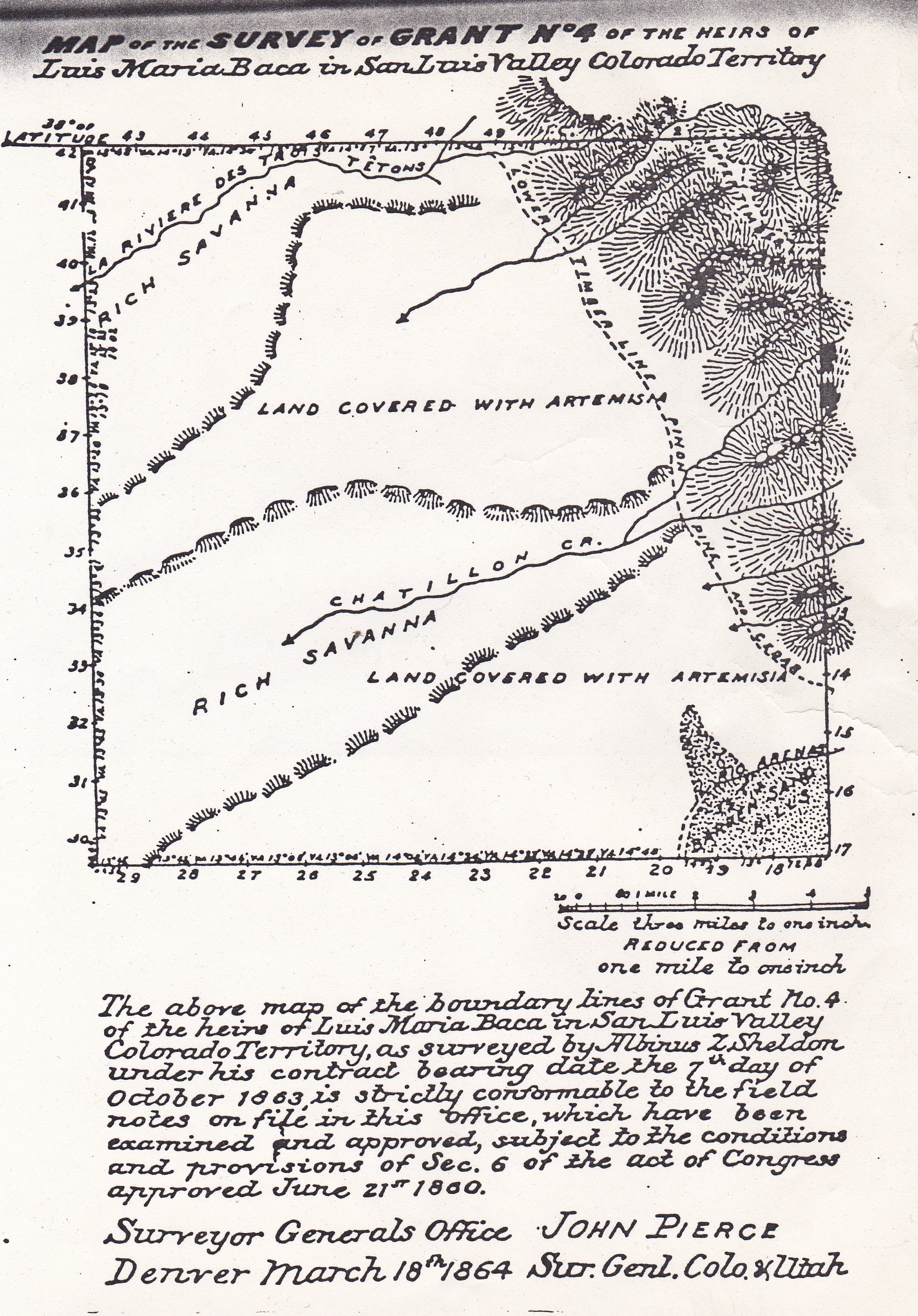
A map of the survey of Baca Grant #4
