= Free box =

Box or location for people to rid themselves of excess items

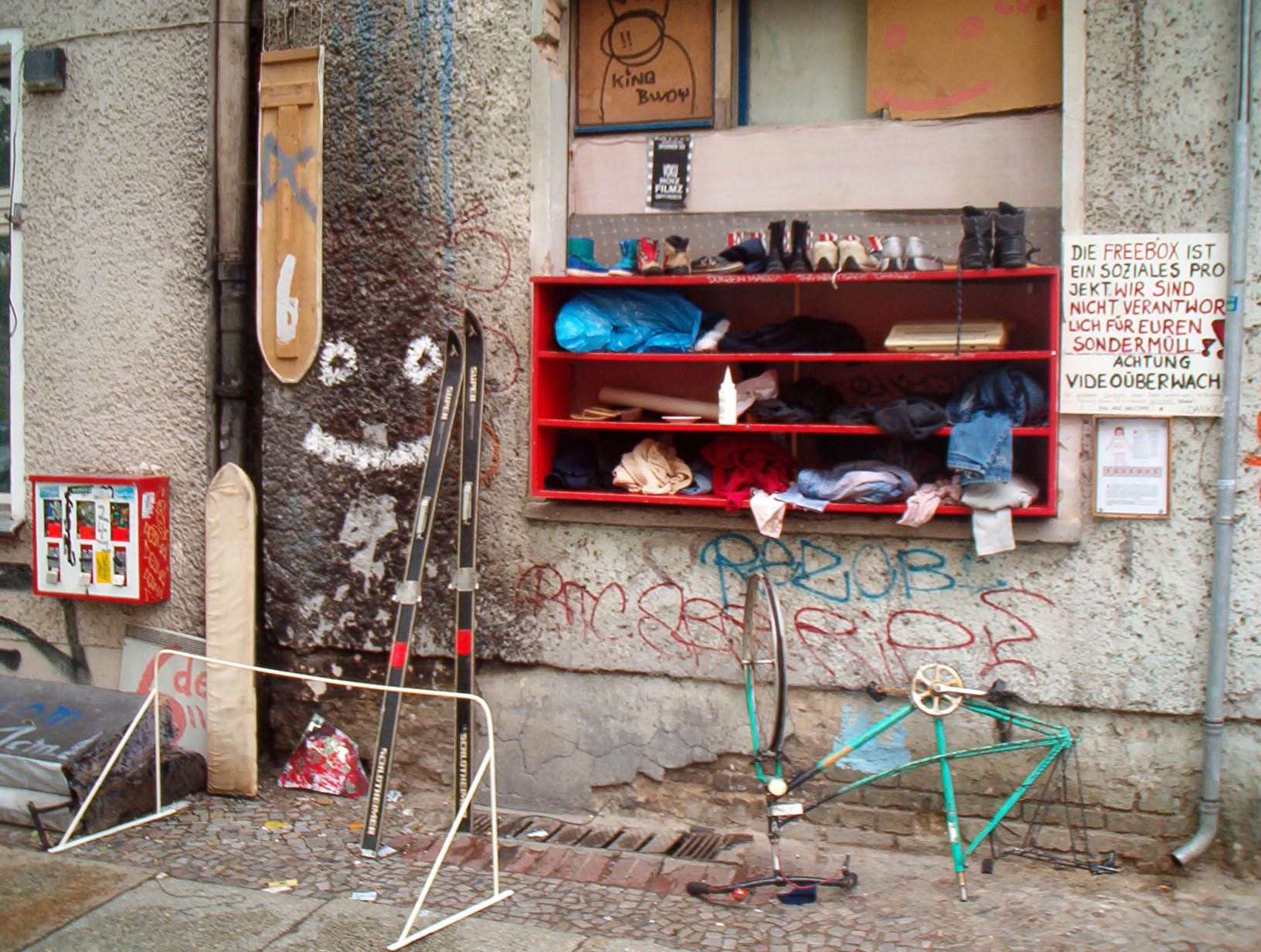
A free box in Berlin, Germany, 2005, serving as a distribution center for free donated materials

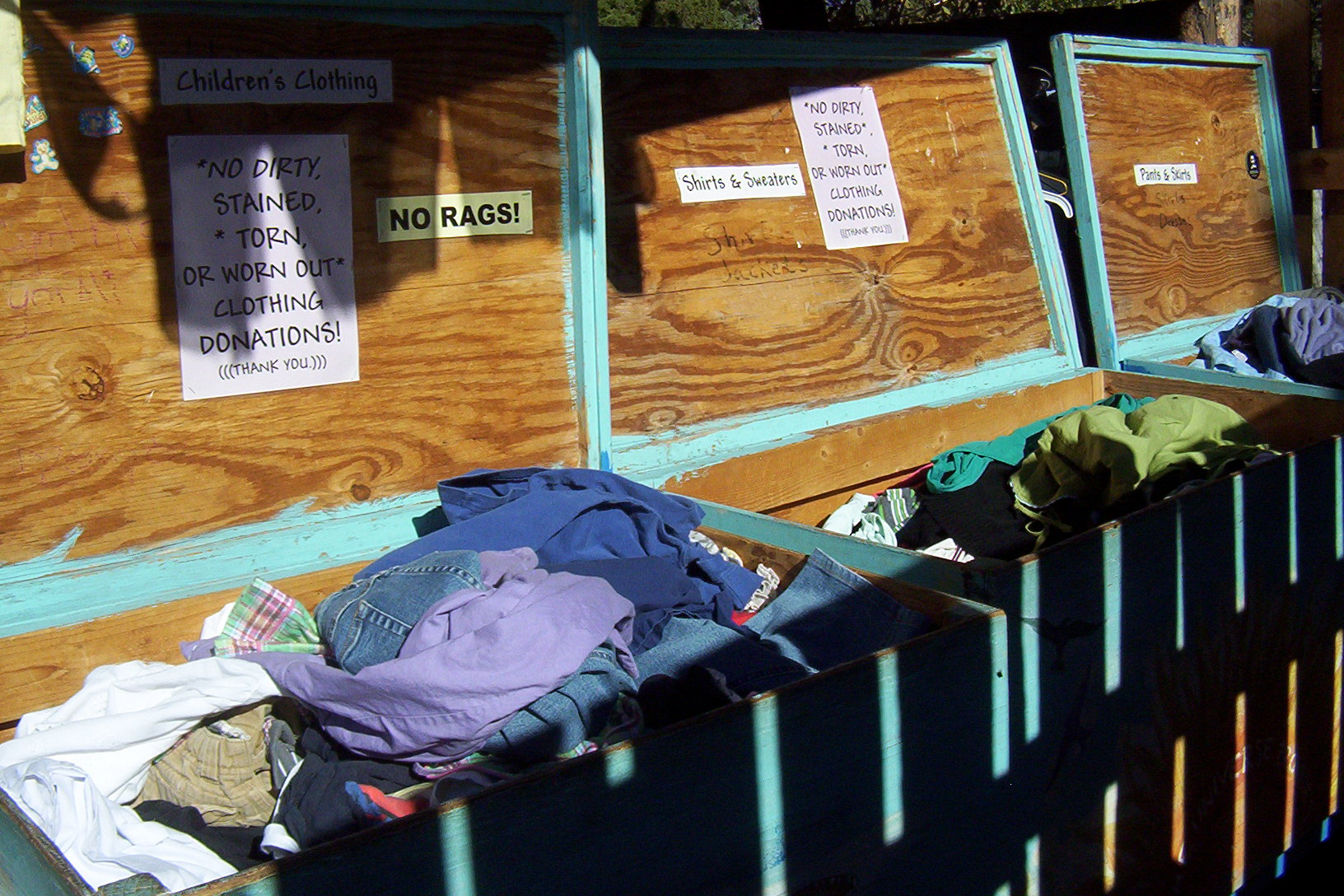
Clothing bins in the Free Box in Crestone, Colorado

A free box is a box or location used to allow for people to rid themselves of excess items without the inconvenience of a garage sale. When someone has items they wish to be rid of, but which might be useful to another person, they are set out and given to whoever wants them. If, after a period, no one has claimed the items, the contents of the box may be donated to a charity like Goodwill or The Salvation Army.

Free boxing is implemented at the University of Saskatchewan, in Victoria, British Columbia, in Isla Vista, California, and in Crestone and Telluride, Colorado.

An online version of a similar concept is The Freecycle Network.

The University of Guelph, in Guelph, Ontario, runs a free table for several weeks of the school year. New College of Florida is home to a student-run free table (open throughout the school year).

== Gallery ==
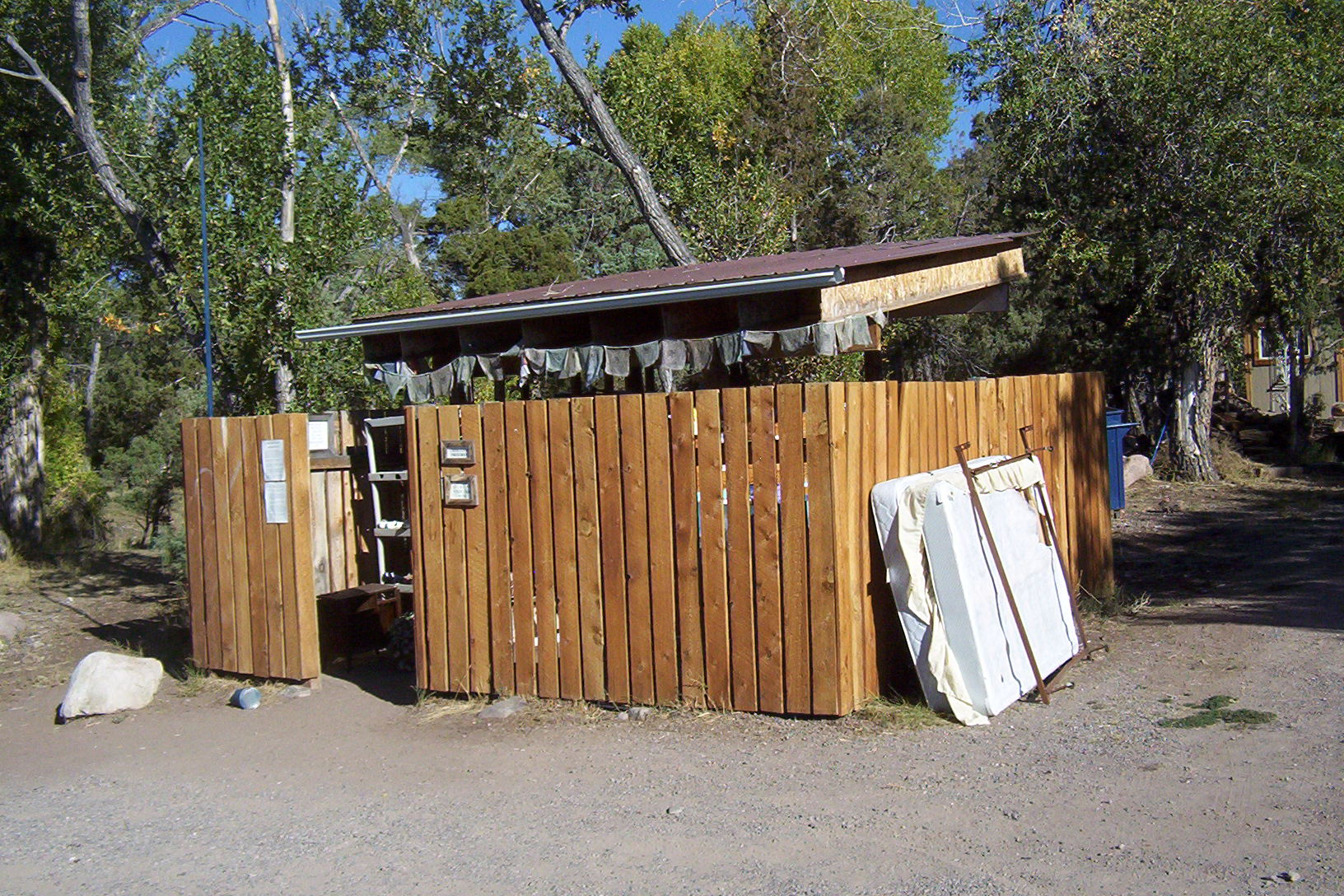
Crestone Free Box

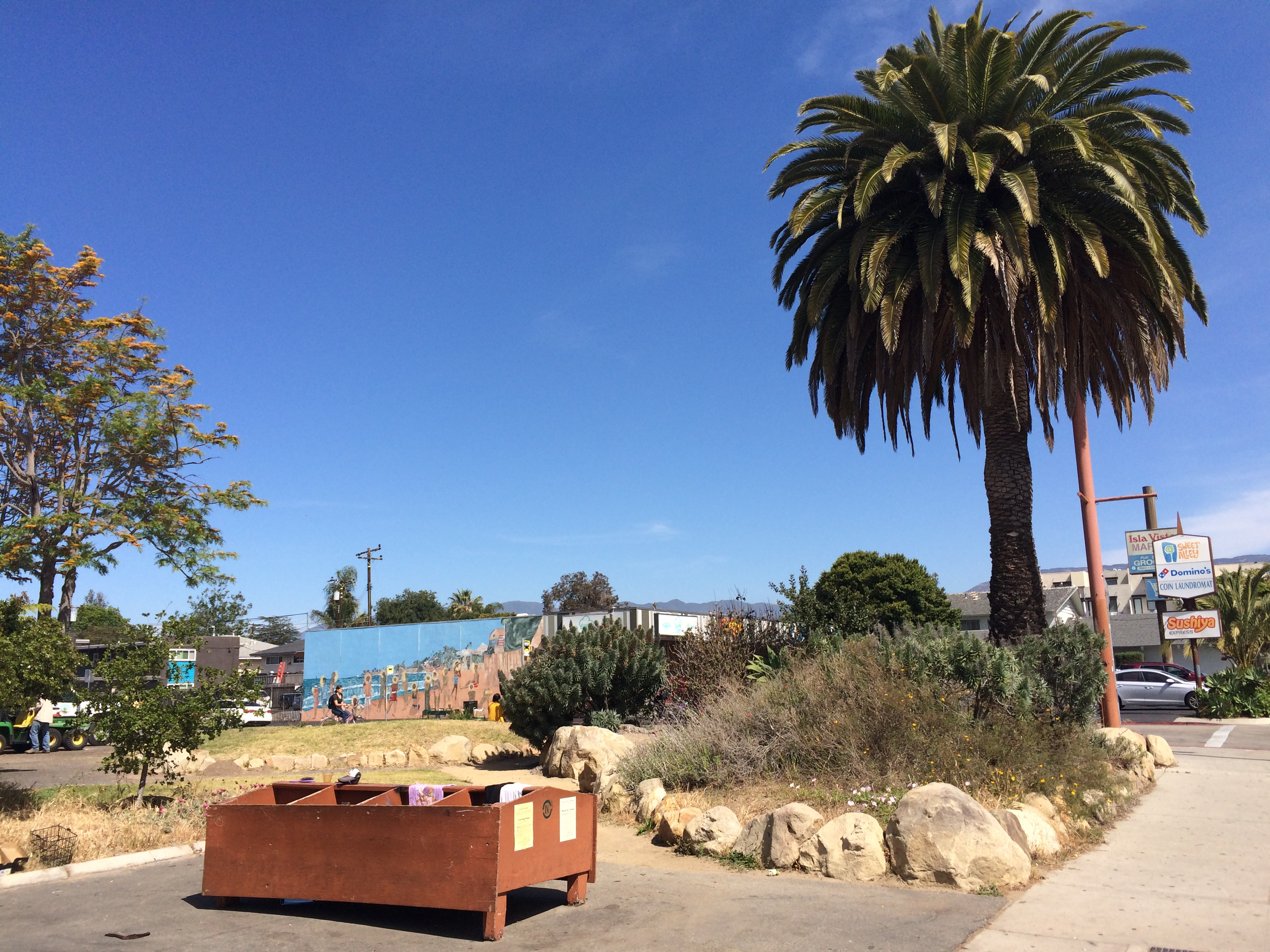
Free box in Isla Vista, California

== See also ==
- Public bookcase
