= Bukar Shaib =

Nigerian diplomat and politician

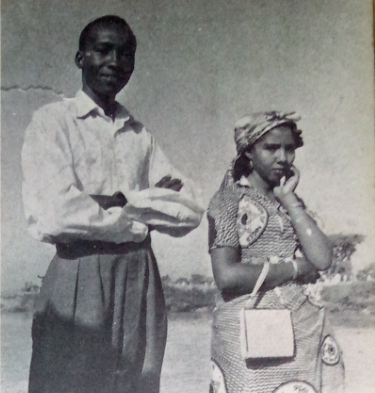
Bukar Shuaib with his wife (1957)

Bukar Shaib was a Nigerian diplomat, who served as the Nigerian Ambassador to Italy from 1979. He also served as a minister for agriculture in the administration of General Buhari. He was born in Borno State, and studied Veterinary medicine at the collegiate level, becoming the first Nigerian Veterinary Doctor. He was a former federal and regional permanent secretary during the Gowon, then Murtala and Obasanjo regimes. He was appointed as special adviser on National Security to President Shehu Shagari. After Shagari's overthrow he was appointed by the new administration as the minister for Agriculture.
