= Sai Maa =

Mauritian spiritual leader

Her Holiness Sai Maa
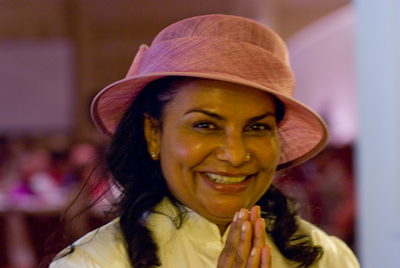
- Born: August 2, 1953 (age 73); Mauritius
- Other name: Sai Maa Lakshmi Devi
- Occupation: Spiritual leader

Sai Maa (birth name unknown), also known as Sai Maa Lakshmi Devi Mishra, is a spiritual guru, businesswoman, energy healer and author. She is known among her followers as the 'Embodiment of the Divine Feminine' and has purported both omnipotence and omniscience. She has offered programmes on energy healing and personal transformation throughout North America, Europe and Asia. One of the central premises of her teachings is that the Earth, and its spiritually evolved human inhabitants, are ascending to a new dimension.

== Early life ==
Sai Maa was born into a Hindu family on the island of Mauritius on August 2, 1953. She has reported to have had spiritually transformative experiences during her childhood. At the age of 21, Sai Maa moved to France, where she would later marry a research scientist and become a mother of two children. While in France, Sai Maa acquired certifications in naturopathic, homeopathic and osteopathic therapies. She ran a private practice which combined alternative healing methods with her Western therapeutic training. Also active in politics, Sai Maa served for several years on the Bordeaux City Council, helping to reform health care in the European Union on behalf of the French government. Sai Maa holds a PhD in Spirituality.

In her late twenties, Sai Maa met and became a disciple of the spiritual leader, Sathya Sai Baba. She travelled frequently to Puttaparthi, India, to study with Sai Baba. While maintaining an active career and family life, Sai Maa focused on practising the teachings and disciplines she learned from Sai Baba and continues to praise Sai Baba to this day.

In an interview, Sai Maa asserted that "Jesus, St Germain and the archangel Michael showed up in her room one day and told her it was time to 'be in the world,' and she left France and began her spiritual path."

== Teaching ==
In the early 1990s, Sai Maa began to travel around the United States, offering events and seminars. In 2000, she established the non-profit organisation Humanity in Unity, based in Boulder, Colorado, through which she offered educational programs and humanitarian service around the world for over a decade. Sai Maa later established the Temple of Consciousness Ashram in Crestone, Colorado, which served for seven years as a global retreat center and the home of the monastic order initiated by Sai Maa. In 2010, the ashram's activities were ended and Sai Maa asked her monks and nuns to move to France, India, Japan, Israel and South America to establish communities to share her teachings.

Sai Maa continued to travel throughout North America, Europe and Asia, offering large public events and seminars, including a programme on the Journey of Profound Healing. She now has thousands of students worldwide and there are more than 200 Sai Maa Awakened Living Groups offered in four languages, where participants gather on a regular basis to meditate and study her teachings. She also offers teachings through online courses. In addition, she founded Awakened Life as a vehicle for the teachings and for Sai Maa's teachers around the world. Sai Maa has participated in events with the Dalai Lama and Thich Nhat Hanh. She has written a book titled Petals of Grace: Essential Teachings for Self-Mastery (2005), and contributed to the publication in 2006 of Grandmothers Counsel the World together with Alice Walker, Gloria Steinem, Carol Moseley Braun, Tenzin Palmo, Helena Norberg-Hodge, Luisah Teish, Wilma Mankiller and others. She created the International Congress on Religion and Modern Civilization in Varanasi, has been a delegate at the World Parliament of Religions and participated in the Synthesis Dialogues at the Pope’s summer residence in Italy.

In 2007, Sai Maa was honored with the title of Jagadguru ("Guru of the world"), the first woman to receive this title in the 2,700 years of the Vishnuswami lineage.

== Philanthropy ==
In 2007 the Sai Maa Vishnu Shakti Trust was established as a registered Indian charity to support Sai Maa’s humanitarian work in India. Projects to date include a center for women's empowerment, distributing food, warm clothing and blankets to the poor, disaster relief work, and free medical services such as cataract surgeries and vitamin distributions to those in need. In 2009 property was purchased at the Harishchandra Ghat in Varanasi as the national headquarters for the Trust, and to house the Sathya Sai Maa Shaktidhaam Ashram, whose construction began in November 2010. It was opened in 2019.
