= Jim MacNeill =

James William MacNeill, OC (April 22, 1928 – March 5, 2016) was a Canadian consultant, environmentalist, and international public servant.

He was Director of Environment at OECD in Paris (1978–1984), Secretary General of the World Commission on Environment and Development (Brundtland Commission) and lead author of its landmark report Our Common Future (1984–1987), and member and Chairman of the World Bank's Inspection Panel (1997–2002).

He was a member of the Caspian Development Advisory Panel, the jury of the Volvo Foundation’s Environment Prize, and a member of several boards including the Woods Hole Research Center, Woods Hole, Massachusetts.

== Background ==
MacNeill was born in Saskatchewan and received Bachelor of Science degrees for both physics and mathematics in 1949 and a Bachelors in Mechanical Engineering in 1958 from the University of Saskatchewan and a Graduate Diploma in Economics and Political Science in 1951 from the Stockholm University, Sweden.

== Career ==
On his return from graduate studies in Sweden, MacNeill began his public service career in Saskatchewan in 1952 as a research economist in T. C. Douglas' cabinet's Economic Advisory and Planning Board. In 1959, he became Executive Director of the South Saskatchewan River Development Commission with responsibility for coordinating the power, irrigation, and other aspects of that project. In 1964, as Vice Chairman and Executive Director of the Saskatchewan Water Resources Commission, his responsibilities were broadened to include management of all of the Province's water resources.

Between 1965 and 1976, he held various senior positions with the Government of Canada. He was Director of Policy and Planning in the then new Canadian Department of Energy, Mines and Resources (1965–1968), moving on to Acting Assistant Deputy Minister, Water and Renewable Resources in 1968. He was appointed Special Advisor on the Constitution and Environment in the Privy Council Office in 1969. Over the next two years, he developed the Government's basic position on the environment and the constitution and wrote his first book, Environmental Management. In 1971, he joined Canada's then new Department of Environment as Director General of Intergovernmental Affairs where he led much of Canada's substantive preparations for the 1972 Stockholm Conference on the Human Environment. In 1972, he became Assistant Secretary and, in 1974, Secretary (or Deputy Minister) of the new Ministry of State for Urban Affairs, Canada's first attempt to intervene nationally in the process of urban growth and development. In 1975, he was additionally appointed Canadian Commissioner General and Ambassador Extraordinary and Plenipotentiary with responsibility for Canada's national and international preparations for the first United Nations Conference on Human Settlements held in Vancouver in May, 1976.

Moving to the international arena in 1977, Jim MacNeill served for seven years in Paris as Director of Environment for the Organization for Economic Cooperation and Development (OECD). While at OECD, he oversaw a program of empirical research on the relationships between the environment and the economy. In 1984, this work resulted in OECD finding that "the environment and the economy could be made mutually reinforcing," a concept that has since moved into the mainstream.

In 1984, he became a member and Secretary General of the World Commission on Environment and Development (the Brundtland Commission). He was the chief architect and principal author of the Commission's world-acclaimed report Our Common Future, which was presented to the UN General Assembly in 1987. Setting out a new global agenda for sustainable development, the report recommended what became the 1992 UN Conference on Environment and Development in Rio (the Earth Summit). From 1989 to 1992, he acted as a Special Advisor to the Secretary General of the Conference, Maurice Strong. He also established and chaired the EcoFund, which raised special funding for preparations of the Conference.

Between 1988 and 2006, MacNeill served in a number of Canadian and international positions: Senior Fellow, Institute for Research on Public Policy (1988–1993); Senior Advisor to the President of the International Development Research Center (IDRC) (1992–1997); and Senior Advisor to the Administrator, United Nations Development Programme (1994–1999) where he carried through a fundamental reorganization of UNDP's work on environment and sustainable development. From 1994-1997, he served as a member on the Board of Directors of Ontario Hydro, then the largest electrical power utility in North America. In 1990, he was asked by Per Gyllenhammar, Chief Executive of Volvo, to assist him in designing the Volvo Foundation’s Environment Prize and has served as a member (and now Chairman) of the Prize Jury ever since.

In 1994, as an advisor to Netherlands Prime Minister Ruud Lubbers, he negotiated an agreement between Mikhail Gorbachev as the Chairman of Green Cross International and Maurice Strong as the Chairman of the Earth Council to undertake the development of an Earth Charter, a code of ethical principles which has now been endorsed by over 8,000 organizations representing more than 100 million people worldwide. In 1990, he was one of three founding members of the International Institute for Sustainable Development, an initiative of Prime Minister Brian Mulroney of Canada and Premier Gary Filmon of Manitoba, and served as Chairman between 1994 and 1999.

In 1997, MacNeill became a member and in 1999 full-time Chairman of the World Banks Independent Inspection Panel to which people affected by a Bank-financed project can appeal for an investigation of their complaints over the heads of their government and of Bank Management. Since 2003, he has been a member of the Caspian Development Advisory Panel, an independent body commissioned by Lord John Browne, Group Chief Executive Officer of BP, to advise him on the economic, environmental and social impacts of the 1,700 km (1,100 mi) Baku–Tbilisi–Ceyhan pipeline and other related BP activities in Azerbaijan, Georgia and Turkey.

== Relationship to Maurice Strong ==
In 2005 the New York Sun ran a front page special edition on the embroilment of Maurice Strong in the Oil-for-Food Programme Scandal, and reported that Jim MacNeill was a close associate of fellow Canadian Maurice Strong, and that MacNeill's career in the United Nations benefited from that relationship.

=== Shared activity ===
Their shared background includes activities ranging from sharing high-profile awards, to sitting on the Board of Directors of the same non-profit corporation to transferring million of dollars of charity money raised by MacNeill in the US to an organization created by Strong in Canada. Strong is credited in assisting with the creation and submission of the 1987 Brundtland Report (called "Our Common Future") that would be presented to the UN General Assembly and become the basis for the 1992 Earth Summit. In 1992 when Maurice Strong launched the Earth Council Foundation (now the Earth Council Alliance) from his position as Secretary General of the U.N. Conference on Environment and Development, Jim MacNeill had a seat on the first Board of Directors. An independent auditor's report for the Earth Council Foundation's operations ending on October 31, 1993 revealed that a charity based in the United States and run by MacNeill called EcoFund '92 (now called Earth Council Foundation U.S.) had sent $1.3 million of its own funds to Maurice Strong's Earth Council Foundation in Canada, which is not a charity but a non-profit corporation. In 2002, the two were the sole recipients of the United Nations Candlelight Award, which was presented to them personally by Kofi Annan.

Since Strong left the UN in 2005 following the Oil-for-Food Programme scandal, there appears to be little linking the two men.

== Awards ==
- In 1983, he received the City of Paris' Silver Medal.
- In 1984, he received the highest achievement award of his native Province of Saskatchewan.
- In 1991, he received the Merit Award of the Climate Institute.
- In 1991, he received the WASA Environmental Award from the King of Sweden.
- In 1994, he received the Lifetime Achievement Award of Environment Canada.
- In 1995, he was appointed is an Officer of the Order of Canada.
- In 2002, UN Secretary General Kofi Annan presented MacNeill and his colleague Maurice Strong with the Candlelight Award for his distinguished service to the United Nations and his key role in promoting and advancing sustainable development.
- In 2006 he received the Elizabeth Haub Award for environmental diplomacy.

== Honours ==
- In 1988, he received an honorary Doctorate of Laws from the University of Saskatchewan.
- In 1992, he received an honorary Doctorate of Science from McGill University.
- In 1993, he received an honorary Doctorate of Environmental Studies from the University of Waterloo.
- In 1994, he received an honorary Doctorate of Humane Letters from Lakehead University.
