= Community Energy Scotland =

Scottish charity

- Founded: 2008
- Type: Charity
- Registration no.: SC SC039673
- Location: Inverness, Highland, Scotland
- Region served: Scotland
- Website: www.communityenergyscotland.org.uk

Community Energy Scotland is an independent Scottish charity established in 2008 that provides advice and financial support for renewable energy projects developed by community groups in Scotland. The stated aim of Community Energy Scotland is 'to build confidence, resilience and wealth at community level in Scotland through sustainable energy development'.

== History ==
Having evolved from the Highlands and Islands Community Energy Company (or HICEC), a subsidiary of Highlands and Islands Enterprise formed in 2004, Community Energy Scotland became an independent entity with a national remit in the summer of 2008. They currently employ 20 members of staff; some are based in the head office in Inverness, and others are based in offices in Edinburgh, Glasgow, Kirkwall, Stornoway, Benbecula and Perth. Community Energy Scotland is an independent charity governed by its members. The charity works closely with its members to develop projects which bring most benefit to their local communities.

Community Energy Scotland supports projects through several different programmes. This extends to non-profit distributing organisations such as social enterprises and housing associations. The charity also delivers programmes from Highlands and Islands Enterprise to support its work with communities in the Highlands and Islands, from The Lottery, and from various regional schemes across Scotland. The charity also acts as a lobbying organisation with the aim of "ensuring that community energy achieves a high status on Scotland's political agenda".

== Projects ==
The renewable energy potential of their area of operation is considerable, with a large number of small communities which are pioneering community owned and led projects. Many of these renewable energy projects are being undertaken by social enterprises such as development trusts.

The projects supported by Community Energy Scotland include:

- The Isle of Gigha in Argyll which boasts Scotland's first community-owned wind farm. Three Vestas V27 turbines on the south end of the island are capable of generating 750 kW of electricity.
- Westray, one of the northern Orkney islands, which runs a vehicle using recycled bio-diesel and whose parish church is an 'eco-congregation'.
- Knoydart, a peninsula in Lochaber which runs a micro hydro-electric scheme.
- Unst in Shetland which is home to the PURE hydrogen fuel research project.
- Findhorn in Moray which is building an eco-village and has recently launched a UN-accredited CIFAL sustainability training centre.
- The island of Eigg is undertaking a £1.3 million electrification project, part funded by HICEC. This combination of installed solar, wind and hydro power should provide a network that is self-sufficient and powered 98% from renewable sources.
- In early 2008 the North Harris Trust received planning consent for three 86 metre (282 ft) wind turbines to be located at Monan. David Cameron, a director of the Trust said: "It will substantially reduce our carbon emissions and it will help North Harris re-establish itself as a thriving, vibrant community".

== Annual conference ==
Since 2005 the annual conference has been held at Inverie, Knoydart; Tarbert, Harris; Sabhal Mòr Ostaig, Skye; Stirling (26–27 August 2009); and Edinburgh (26 October 2010).

== See also ==
- Renewable energy in Scotland
- Sustainable development in Scotland
- Local Energy Scotland
