= Infrastructure damage during the Russo-Georgian War =

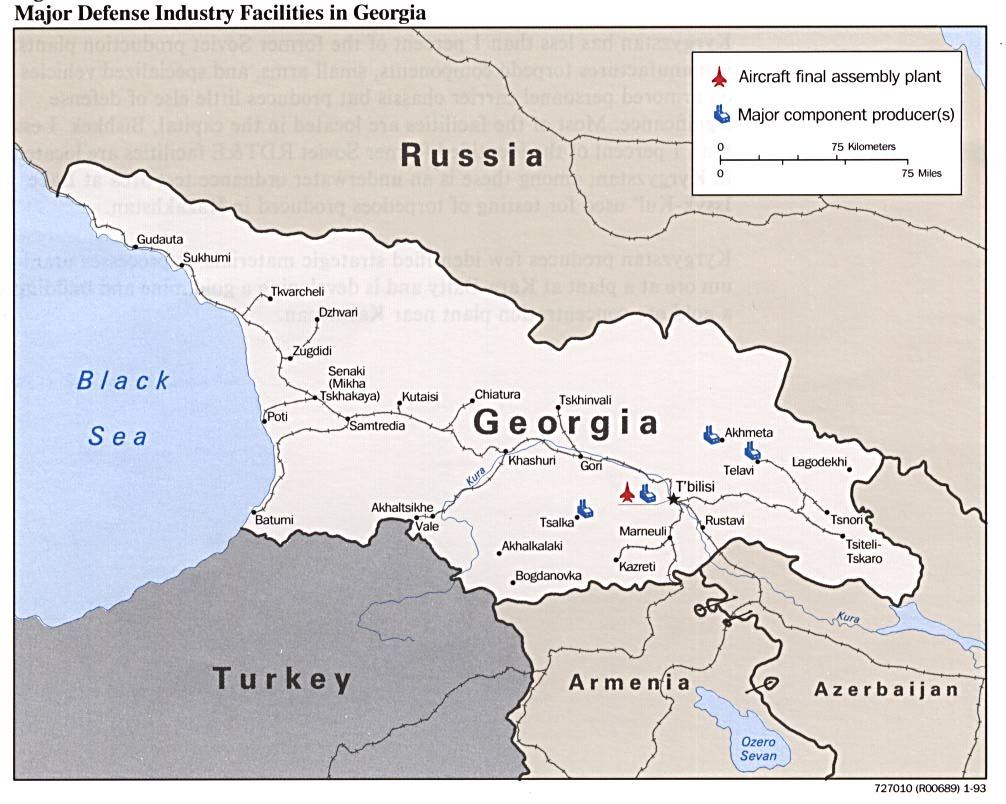
1993 US map of Georgia's defence industry: Tbilaviamsheni, an aircraft-assembly plant in Tbilisi which was bombed during the war, and component plants in other cities

Some Infrastructure damage during the Russo-Georgian War took place.

== Background ==
According to Human Rights Watch (HRW):

"[o]n the night of August 7-8, Georgian forces subjected the city of Tskhinvali and several nearby Ossetian villages, including Nizhnii Gudjabauri and Khetagurovo, to heavy shelling. [...] Tskhinvali was heavily shelled during daytime hours on August 8. [...] Shelling resumed at a smaller scale on August 9, when Georgian forces were targeting Russian troops who by then had moved into Tskhinvali and other areas of South Ossetia."

HRW reported that South Ossetian fighters took up positions in civilian objects (including schools), making them permissible military aims. Several of these objects were then targeted by Georgian artillery.

== Tskhinvali ==
On 12 August 2008, local authorities claimed that about 70 percent of Tskhinvali's buildings (public and private) had been damaged during the Georgian military operation. According to later Russian statement, about 20 percent of Tskhinvali's buildings had been damaged and 10 percent were "beyond repair". In late August, South Ossetian parliament deputy speaker Tarzan Kokoity claimed that according to a preliminary assessment, Georgian damage in South Ossetia was valued at 100 billion Russian rubles.

The Georgian government reported that Tskhinvali "was largely reduced to rubble" as a result of Russian air attacks. "When aircraft started bombing our positions in Tskhinvali, this is when most civilian buildings were burned", explained Davit Kezerashvili. Russian journalist Yulia Latynina also blamed Russia for damaging the city, saying that when Georgian forces entered Tskhinvali it was intact. After they were driven out by the Russians, the city was in ruins.

== Russia bombings ==
Russia bombed airfields and other economic infrastructure. The Black Sea port of Poti was also bombed, where eight to eleven Russian warplanes reportedly attacked container tanks and a shipbuilding plant. On 15 August 2008, Russian forces advancing towards Tbilisi blew up the railway bridge near Kaspi, about 50 km (31 mi) from the Georgian capital. The cement factory and civilian area in Kaspi were also damaged by Russian bombing. The destruction of the railway bridge sabotaged the east-west link of Georgia and Armenia's main trade route.

Nikolay Bordyuzha, Secretary-General of the Collective Security Treaty Organization, stated that Armenia lost $500 million due to problems with the communications during the war.

== United Nations Institute for Training and Research ==
The United Nations Institute for Training and Research (UNITAR) released a series of detailed satellite maps of the regions affected by the war, obtained on 19 August from UNOSAT. Damage was assessed primarily from satellite images with a resolution of 50 cm. Since it was an initial assessment, it was not independently validated on the ground. UNOSAT reported that 230 buildings in Tskhinvali (5.5 percent of the total) were destroyed or severely damaged. In the villages north of the city, up to 51.9 percent of buildings were damaged. UNOSAT provided imagery of six Georgian naval vessels partially or completely submerged in Poti; no other damage to physical infrastructure or ship-related oil spills were revealed.

Human Rights Watch used the UNOSAT satellite images to prove the rampant arson of ethnic-Georgian villages by Ossetian militia in South Ossetia. Amnesty International noted that the Russo-Georgian battle in Tskhinvali during the war had possibly resulted in the destruction of most of the city by the end of large-scale conflict by 10 August; however, after the war Georgian villages near Tskhinvali were damaged.
