= GMG =

GMG may refer to:

- Generalized myasthenia gravis
- GMG Airlines, an airline of Bangladesh, not in operation
- GMG Community School District in Iowa
- GNU MediaGoblin
- Good Morning Gloucester, a daily report of life on the docks of "America's Oldest Seaport"
- Green Man Gaming, an online retailer for PC video games
- Grenade machine gun, an automatic grenade launcher
  - HK GMG, an automatic grenade launcher made by Heckler & Koch

== Organizations ==
- Gamecock Media Group
- Garden Media Guild, a British trade association for garden writers, photographers and broadcasters
- Girls Make Games, an American organization
- Gizmodo Media Group
- Global Migration Group, an inter-agency group on international migration issues
- Guardian Media Group
  - GMG Radio, a division of the above
