= Funds parking =

In the context of international migration, funds parking is transferring money into one's bank account just before applying for a travel visa in the hopes of increasing one's chances of being granted the visa. The motivation for funds parking is that many countries, before granting permission to enter, consider the applicant's bank account balance as part of assessing whether the traveler will be willing and able to support his or herself for the duration of the trip, and to leave the country when required. Funds parking, therefore, is a deceptive practice. When immigration officers notice unexplained cash deposits in a bank account statement, they may assume that they constitute an attempt at funds parking and refuse the visa application. The term funds parking comes from the financial term parking.
