= Sindhekela =

- Village
- ସିନ୍ଧେକେଲା
- Nickname: SKL
- Location in Balangir, Odisha, India Sindhekela (India)
- Coordinates: 20.2315269°N 82.9391555°E
- Country: India
- State: Odisha
- District: Balangir

Government
  - Type: Panchayat
  - Body: Sindhekela G.P
  - Member of Legislative Assembly: Sj. Laxman Bag, (BJP)
- Elevation: 215 m (705 ft)

Population (2011 Census)
  - Total: 5,734

Languages
  - Official: Odia
  - Local: Sambalpuri
- Time zone: UTC+5:30 (IST)
- PIN: 767035
- Vehicle registration: OD-03 / OR-03
- Website: odisha.gov.in

Sindhekela is a village in Balangir district in the Western Odisha region of Odisha India. Sindhekela is one of the business hub in Balangir district.

== Transport ==
The nearby Titilagarh railway station is a junction on the Jharsuguda–Vizianagaram line and Kantabanji railway station Raipur–Vizianagaram line. Through this it is connected to all major cities of India. It was one of the major railway stations in the Sambalpur railway division under East Coast Railway Zone. There is a state highway SH-42 between Sindhekela and Balangir district via Kantabanji which also connected with SH-16 and MDR-13 between Sindhekela to Titilagrh. The historical place Ranipur Jharial, known as "Soma Tirtha" in scriptures, is near Sindhekela. It combines a section of religious faiths like Saivism, Buddhism, Vaisnavism and Tantrism. The circular open vault enclosure of sixty-four yoginis, the major attraction of the place, is one of four such shrines in India. The temple of Someswar Siva is the noted one among the approximately 50 temples here. The brick temple of Indralath is said to be the tallest brick temple of Odisha. Distance 100 km from Dist. HQ Communication Road Rail - Nearest station- Kantabanji Lodging and Boarding Kantabanji.Tributaries of the Tel, Sundar river flows near Sindhekela.

== Education ==
- Pallishree Junior Mahavidyalaya, Sindhekela
- Pallishree High School, Sindhekela
- Govt.(Boys) Primary School, Sindhekela
- Govt.(Girls) UP School, Sindhekela
- Govt. Nodal Upper Primary School, Sindhekela
- Saraswati Shishu Mandir, Sindhekela
- J.M.D. English Medium School, Sindhekela
- B.R Ambedkar English Medium School, Sindhekela

== Notable people ==
- Dilip Ratha-CEO, KNOMAD – World Bank
- Abhisek Dash- Working President, Western Odisha Yuva Manch- WOYM
