= UNSC (disambiguation) =

UNSC may refer to:

== United Nations ==
- United Nations Security Council, the most powerful organ of the United Nations, charged with maintaining peace and security between nations
- United Nations Special Commission, an organisation which performed inspections in Iraq (correctly abbreviated UNSCOM)
- United Nations Scientific Committee on the Effects of Atomic Radiation (correctly abbreviated UNSCEAR)
- United Nations Statistical Commission, oversees the work of the United Nations Statistics Division (UNSD)
- United Nations System Staff College, a provider of learning and training for UN staff (correctly abbreviated UNSSC)

== Fiction ==
- United Nations Space Command, a fictional organization in the Halo series of games and novels
