= Peacekeeping training programme =

Programme of the United Nations Institute for Training and Research

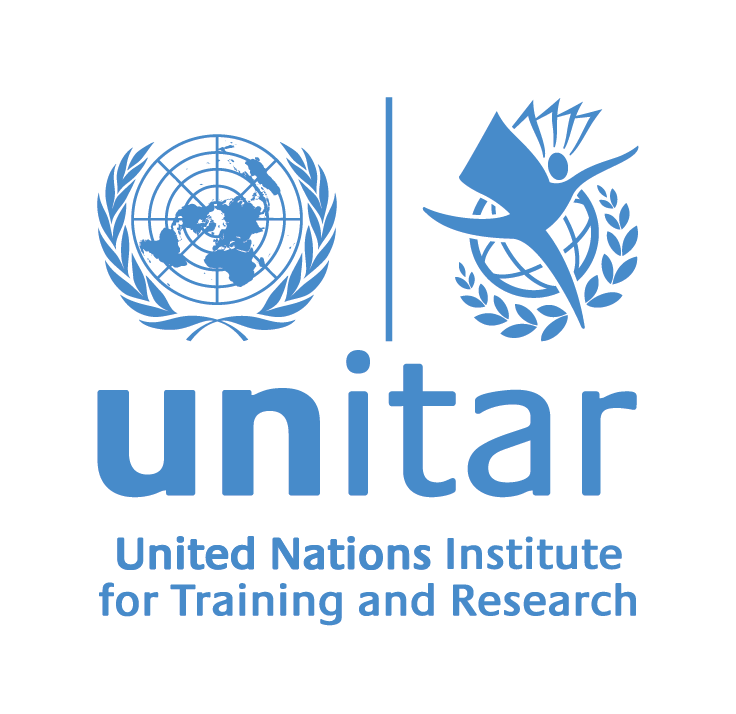
- Abbreviation: UNITAR PTP
- Type: Specialized Agency
- Legal status: Active
- Website: www.unitar.org/ptp

UNITAR PTP is the United Nations Institute for Training and Research (UNITAR) peacekeeping training programme. The peacekeeping training programme contributes to the international community's efforts towards the peaceful resolution of conflicts and the building of lasting peace. Recognizing that peace is a prerequisite for the achievement of the post-2015 Sustainable Development Goals, the peacekeeping training programme supports the development of capacities in the areas of peacekeeping, peacebuilding and crisis management. Through innovative and results-oriented approaches, the Programme strengthens the knowledge and skills of individuals, groups or institutions.

Numerous countries around the world are suffering from protracted conflicts, often spilling over into neighbouring countries. The resulting regional instability particularly damages the security of communities and individuals, thus hindering social and economic development. In its 2011 independent report on “Civilian Capacity in the Aftermath of Conflict” (A/65/747 – S/2011/85), the Senior Advisory Group appointed by the UN Secretary-General established a direct connection between conflict relapse and the critical shortage of national capacities for peace in countries emerging from conflict.

While efforts to ensure the short-term stabilisation of conflicts through humanitarian operations and peacekeeping are often successful, the long-term establishment of sustainable peace remains a challenge. The Senior Advisory Group explains that “[a]s communities emerge from conflict, they often face a critical shortage of capacities needed to secure a sustainable peace — the core capacities to run a government, to re-establish institutions of justice, to reintegrate demobilizing fighters, to revitalize the economy, to restore basic health and education, and many more.” Despite the best efforts of international actors, attempts to build a lasting peace are challenged by the lack of knowledge and skills on critical areas of peacebuilding in the societies affected by violence. In this regard, the Senior Advisory Group explains that “the international community has had less success in supporting and enabling the national capacities that are essential or an enduring peace.” It further contends that the United Nations’ inability to “transfer skills and knowledge to national actors…has increased the risk of relapse into conflict.”

Training and the dissemination of fundamental knowledge and skills are at the core of the peacekeeping training programme activities, as essential steps in strengthening existing peace capacity, ensuring national ownership and building resilience in post-conflict countries.
