= Sustainable development in Scotland =

Definitions of sustainability often refer to the "three pillars" of social, environmental and economic sustainability.

Sustainable development in Scotland has a number of distinct strands. The idea of sustainable development was used by the Brundtland Commission which defined it as development that "meets the needs of the present without compromising the ability of future generations to meet their own needs." At the 2005 World Summit it was noted that this requires the reconciliation of environmental, social and economic demands - the "three pillars" of sustainability. These general aims are being addressed in a diversity of ways by the public, private, voluntary and community sectors in Scotland.

== Sustainable communities ==
Scotland's first dedicated programme for sustainable communities was delivered by Forward Scotland between 1997 and 1999 as part of a UK wide initiative led by Encams. Partnerships with a number of local authorities were developed and dedicated officers recruited to work with communities. This programme piloted the Community Eco-cal a forerunner of ecological footprinting. This programme was evaluated by Professor Michael Carley, Heriot-Watt University and the lessons learned informed a successor programme, 2000–2002, where community groups themselves were the focus. This produced the very first handbook for sustainable communities and a series of highly successful community projects. During this time the first community grants programme for sustainable communities was launched funded by the New Opportunities Fund (now the Big Lottery Fund). This programme funded some pioneering projects in areas such as community renewables, local food, community waste management and the first ecological footprinting projects in Scotland.

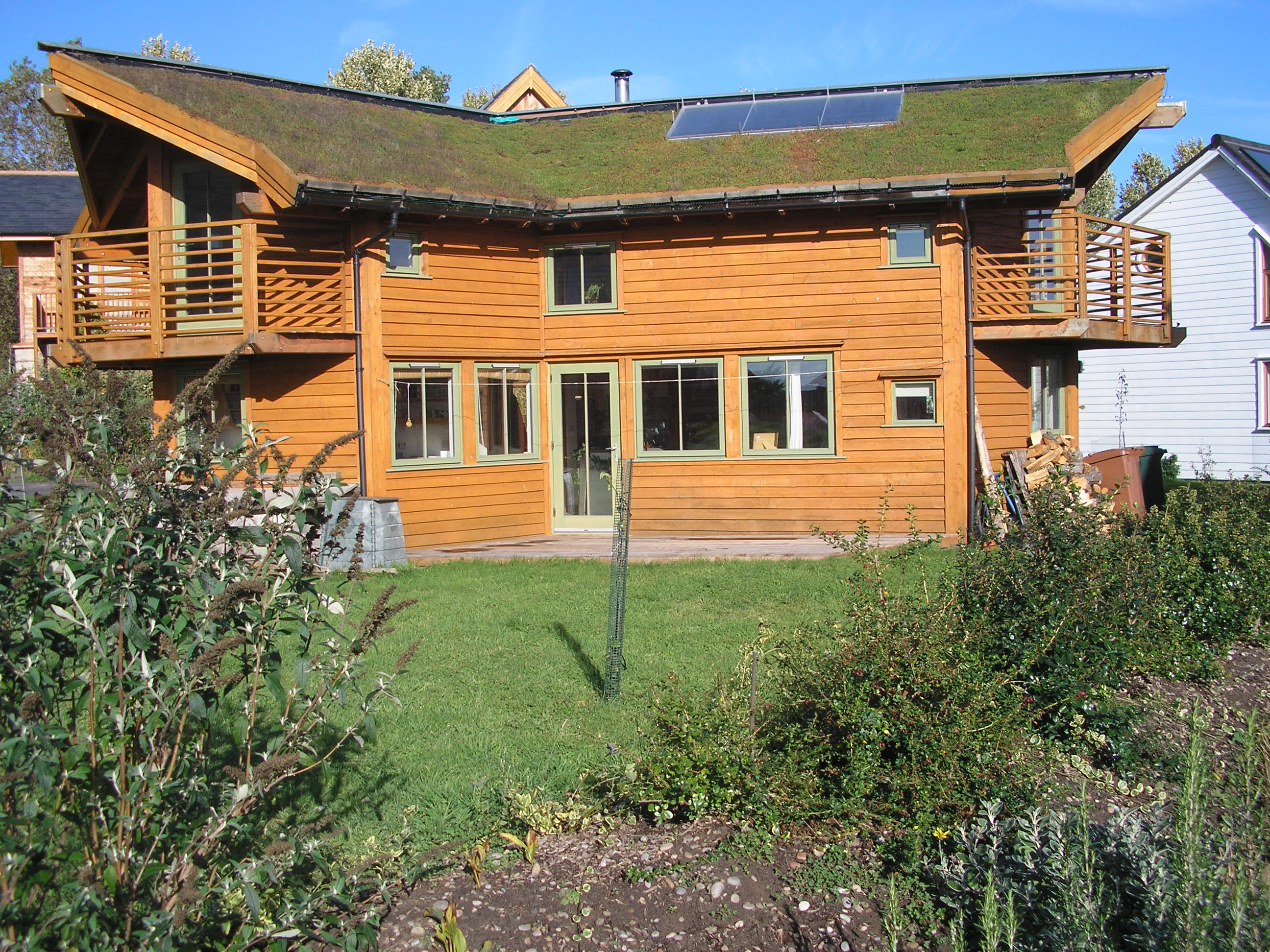
Eco-house at Findhorn Ecovillage

In April 2007 plans were announced for Biggar to become the first 'carbon-neutral' town in Scotland. In the same month Findhorn Ecovillage confirmed that its ecological footprint is the lowest ever recorded in the industrialised world. In January 2008 HICEC published a report to "review the opportunities and actions needed to support an island community to become carbon-neutral". Following this, in June 2008 it was announced that Stirling was aiming to become Britain's first carbon-neutral city, hosting the Going Carbon Neutral Stirling project.

Community Energy Scotland is a charity that provides free advice, grant funding and finance for renewable energy projects developed by community groups in Scotland. The main aim of the company is to enable all communities to generate and use renewable energy for their long term and collective benefit. In March 2010 the local development trust on the island of Tiree commissioned a 950 kW community-owned wind turbine project, the fourth such large-scale project in Scotland.

Transition Town projects aim to raise awareness of sustainable living and build local ecological resilience. Examples in Scotland include Forres, Portobello, West Kilbride and Hawick.

In August 2010 the historian James Hunter stated that the transfer of ownership into community control had brought about "a spectacular reversal of Gigha's slide towards complete population collapse" and suggested that the UK Government should learn lessons from this and other community buy-outs in places such as Assynt, Eigg, and Knoydart to inform their Big Society plans. These successes notwithstanding, civil servants have been criticised for impeding community buy-outs of land via the Land Reform (Scotland) Act 2003. For example, the proposed community purchase of the former RAF Machrihanish base was thwarted due to technical problems with the application despite 97.4% local support in a referendum.

== Public sector ==
=== Government policy ===
The first serious policy was written in 1998 in anticipation of the Scottish Parliament in 1999, by the Secretary of State's Advisory Group for Sustainable Development. This was followed by strategy that focussed on Waste, Energy and Travel in 2002 and Choosing our Future in 2005, which was written in association with the UK shared framework for sustainable development. In 2007 the Scottish National Party took office in a minority government pursuing 5 strategic objectives that encompass sustainable development but do not specifically reference it. Instead the government has adopted sustainable economic growth as its principal target.

In June 2007 John Swinney, the new Cabinet Secretary for Finance and Sustainable Growth in the Scottish Government, announced plans for a Climate Change Bill that would include an intention to cut greenhouse gas emissions by 80% by 2050.

In August 2007 the Scottish Government announced the creation of a Saltire Prize for innovation in industry, which will reward excellence in developing new renewable energy technologies. In contrast the UK government's stance the Scottish Government have ruled out both new nuclear power stations in Scotland and the burial of nuclear waste.

The passage of the Climate Change (Scotland) Act 2009 has a created and informed a wide variety of initiatives. The Climate Change Delivery Plan sets out what needs to be done to achieve emissions reductions to meet the statutory targets that are included in the Act. The Climate Change Adaptation Framework, published in December 2009 aims to build resilience and capacity for change. Other public sector initiatives include:

- The Renewable Energy Framework, the Renewables Action Plan, and the Renewable Heat Action Plan
- The Flood Risk Management (Scotland) Act 2009
- Scotland's Climate Change Declaration
- The Rural Land Use Study
- The Scottish Climate Change Impact Partnership

=== Scottish Sustainable Development Forum ===
The Scottish Sustainable Development Forum (SSDF) is a group the focussed on promoting debate and action on sustainable development issues in Scotland. Forum membership is open to any individual who wishes to make Scotland more sustainable.

=== Public bodies ===
In January 2010 it emerged that SEPA, the government body responsible for protecting the environment had failed to reach its carbon emissions targets. Its aim is to cut CO_{2} emissions from business activities by 25% by 2012 compared with 2006 but a report showed that they had risen by 10% in the past year.

== Energy production and distribution ==
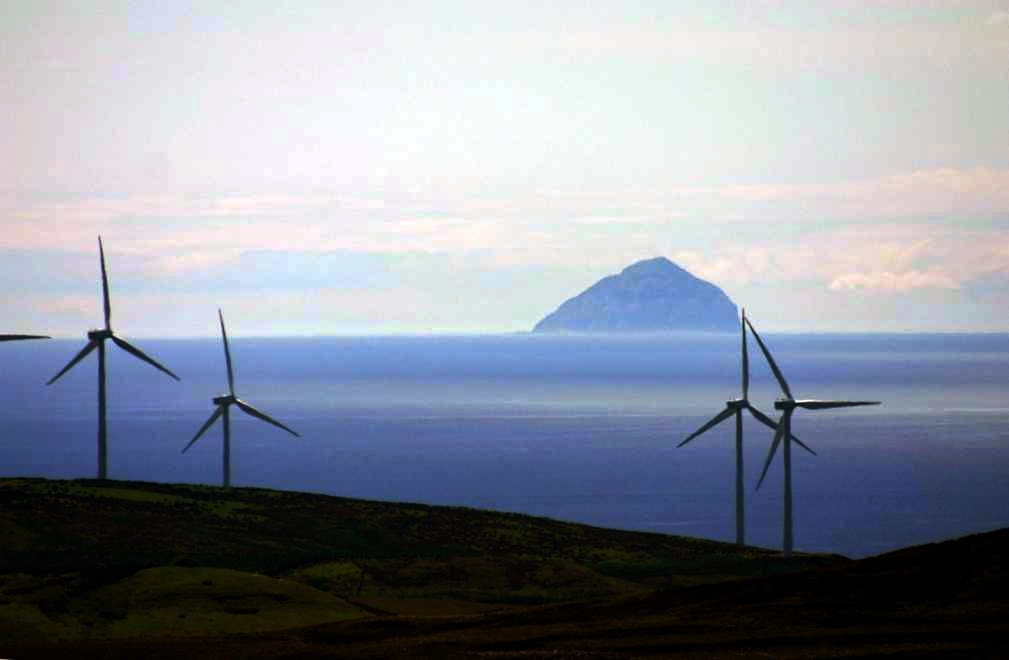
Wind, wave and tide make up more than 80% of Scotland's renewable energy potential.

The natural resource base for renewables is extraordinary by European, and even global standards. In addition to an existing installed capacity^{[a]} of 1.3 Gigawatts (GW) of hydro-electric schemes, Scotland has an estimated potential of 36.5 GW of wind and 7.5 GW of tidal power, 25% of the estimated total capacity for the European Union and up to 14 GW of wave power potential, 10% of EU capacity. The renewable electricity generating capacity may be 60 GW or more, considerably greater than the existing capacity from all Scottish fuel sources of 10.3 GW.

Much of this potential remains untapped, but continuing improvements in engineering are enabling more of the renewable resources to be utilised. Fears regarding "peak oil" and climate change have driven the subject high up the political agenda and are also encouraging the use of various biofuels. Although the finances of many projects remain either speculative or dependent on subsidies, it is probable that there has been a significant, and in all likelihood long-term change, in the underpinning economics.

In addition to planned increases in both large-scale generating capacity and microsystems using renewable sources, various related schemes to reduce carbon emissions are being researched. Although there is significant support from the public, private and community-led sectors, concerns about the effect of the technologies on the natural environment have been expressed. There is also an emerging political debate about the relationship between the siting, and the ownership and control of these widely distributed resources.

=== Wind power ===
Wind power in Scotland is an area of considerable activity, with 1550 MW of installed capacity as at October 2008. Wind power is the fastest growing of the renewable energy technologies in Scotland and the world's largest wind turbine generator (5 MW) is currently undergoing testing in the North Sea, 15 miles off the east coast. There are numerous large wind farms as well as a number, both planned and operating, which are in community ownership. The siting of turbines is sometimes an issue, but surveys have shown high levels of community acceptance for wind power in Scotland. There is further potential for expansion, especially offshore, given the high average wind speeds.

In May 2008 Scottish and Southern Energy confirmed it was proceeding with the Greater Gabbard wind farm, located off the south coast of England. However, they sold their stake in this project, expected to become the largest wind farm in the world, to Npower some six months later.

=== Lower carbon power stations ===
In May 2007 Scottish Power announced that Alstom Power and Doosan Babcock had been commissioned to design plans for "clean coal" technology at Longannet and Cockenzie power stations. This would have become the largest project of its kind in Europe but it was cancelled in 2011 after the Westminster Government withdrew funding. Scottish Power have also announced that they wished to reduce carbon emissions by using biomass products such as willow or cereals at Longannet and Cockenzie. This could save up to 300,000 tonnes (330,000 tons) of carbon emissions per annum. However, the challenge of replacing large-scale power production with renewables was highlighted by the fact that to replace 5% of the fuel from these plants, fully 12% of Scotland's agricultural land would be required.

=== Carbon sequestration ===
The British Geological Survey estimate that potentially 755 billion tonnes of CO_{2} could be stored in carbon dioxide sinks in the North Sea (Scotland's annual CO_{2} output is circa 50 million tonnes). The process also aids the recovery of oil and gas as it increases pressure in the oil field. The DTI estimate that as much as 2 billion additional barrels of oil could be recovered as a result of CO_{2} injection.

Although this process could reduce CO_{2} emissions from conventional power plants by as much as 80–90%, if combined with increased oil recovery the net savings in carbon emissions may be much less as the total volume of oil and gas used from that field would increase.

=== Electricity distribution ===
However, controversy has arisen about Ofgem's proposed plans to increase transmission charges for distant electrical generation. This was widely seen as placing renewable energy production in Scotland at a considerable disadvantage. Jason Ormiston, the chief executive of Scottish Renewables was quoted as saying "At a time when the UK government's chief scientific adviser has said that climate change is the greatest threat to humanity, here we have the industry regulator penalising renewable electricity generators for generating where the resource is greatest." The issue was highlighted the following month when leaked Department of Trade and Industry documents indicated that, despite Scottish successes, under current policies Britain would miss the EU's 2020 target of 20% energy from renewables by a considerable margin. In the same month a report by Xero Energy Limited into these 'use of system' transmission charges across Europe indicated that the UK system creates costs that are up to thirty times higher in Scotland than elsewhere in Europe and that charges for the islands are "almost certainly higher than any other European country". Rob Gibson an MSP for the Highlands and Islands described the charges as "a tax on geography", and Elaine Hanton of HIE claimed the report raised "serious concerns".

Discussions between the Scottish and Norwegian governments aimed at creating a sub-sea grid to take renewable energy from Scotland to the European mainland are planned for early 2008.

=== Hydrogen economy ===
An innovative approach was proposed by BP in partnership with Scottish and Southern Energy for the creation of a hydrogen-based power station at Peterhead. The project would have taken natural gas extracted from the North Sea, crack the gas to produce hydrogen and carbon dioxide, and burn the hydrogen as the fuel source to create electricity in a 475 MW power station. The CO_{2} would then have been returned to the Miller field reservoir more than 4 kilometres (2 mi) under the seabed in a process called carbon sequestration (see above). The scheme was expected to be in production by 2009 at a projected cost of $600 million, although it fell through as it failed to gain sufficient support from the UK government to enable this to occur. Had it been completed, the plant would have been the first industrial-scale, hydrogen power station in the world.

In October 2007 a joint venture was announced by the PURE Energy Centre and the Hjaltland Housing Association to create two “unplugged” hydrogen houses on a remote site in Eshaness, Northmavine, in Shetland. The installation will involve two combined heat and power systems, wind turbines and a hydrogen fuel cell to heat the houses at times when the wind is not blowing. There is also the possibility of a hydrogen refuelling station at the site for hydrogen-powered cars. A spokesman for PURE said “Forty per cent of the world-wide population lives with no access to electricity and heat. The CHP scheme will provide these populations with such access. There will be no impact on the environment whatsoever. This is totally clean energy."

== Housing ==
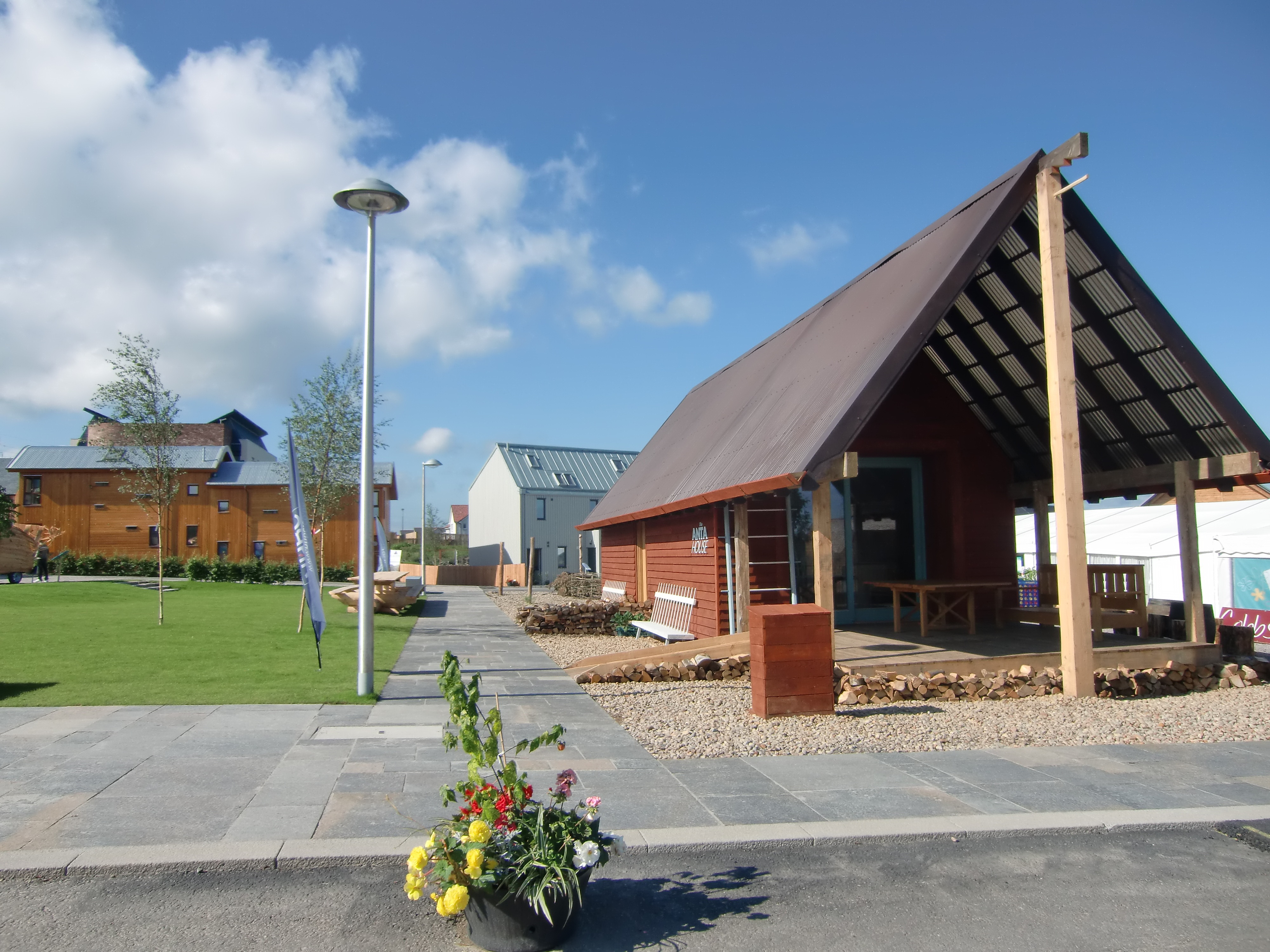
Eco-houses at the Inverness expo

"Tygh-Na-Cladach" (English: the house by the shore") in Dunoon is the UK's first "affordable" passivhaus, designed by Gokay Deveci of Robert Gordon University for Fyne Homes. For the month of August 2010 Scotland's first green housing expo opened in Inverness. The event showcased 52 new designs.

== Waste treatment ==
Moray Council has announced an 800 kW landfill gas project near Spey Bay. Contractors Renewable Power Systems expect the facility to come into production in 2008. There are as yet no plans for Plasma arc waste disposal in Scotland although a plant is under construction at Swindon in England.

In 2013 Baron Wallace of Tankerness sided with liquidators KPMG who are arguing UK insolvency law has precedence over Scottish environmental regulations. Wallace's position, taken "on behalf of the UK Government" is that the liquidators have the power to abandon environmental clean-up costs after the company with the responsibility for them has gone bust. KPMG estimates the liquidation of Scottish Coal will leave up to £30 million that would be paid to creditor Lloyds Bank rather go towards the restoration of disused mines in Ayrshire and Lanarkshire. Opponents of KPMG include the Scottish Government, the Scottish Environment Protection Agency, South Lanarkshire Council and East Ayrshire Council.

== Agriculture and food ==
In November 2008, Keenan Recycling completed a £3.2 million plant at New Deer for the production of organic fertilisers. Capable of producing 20,000 tonnes per annum the operators hope to capitalise on the soaring price of compound fertilisers, which tripled in the previous 18 months.

== Transport ==
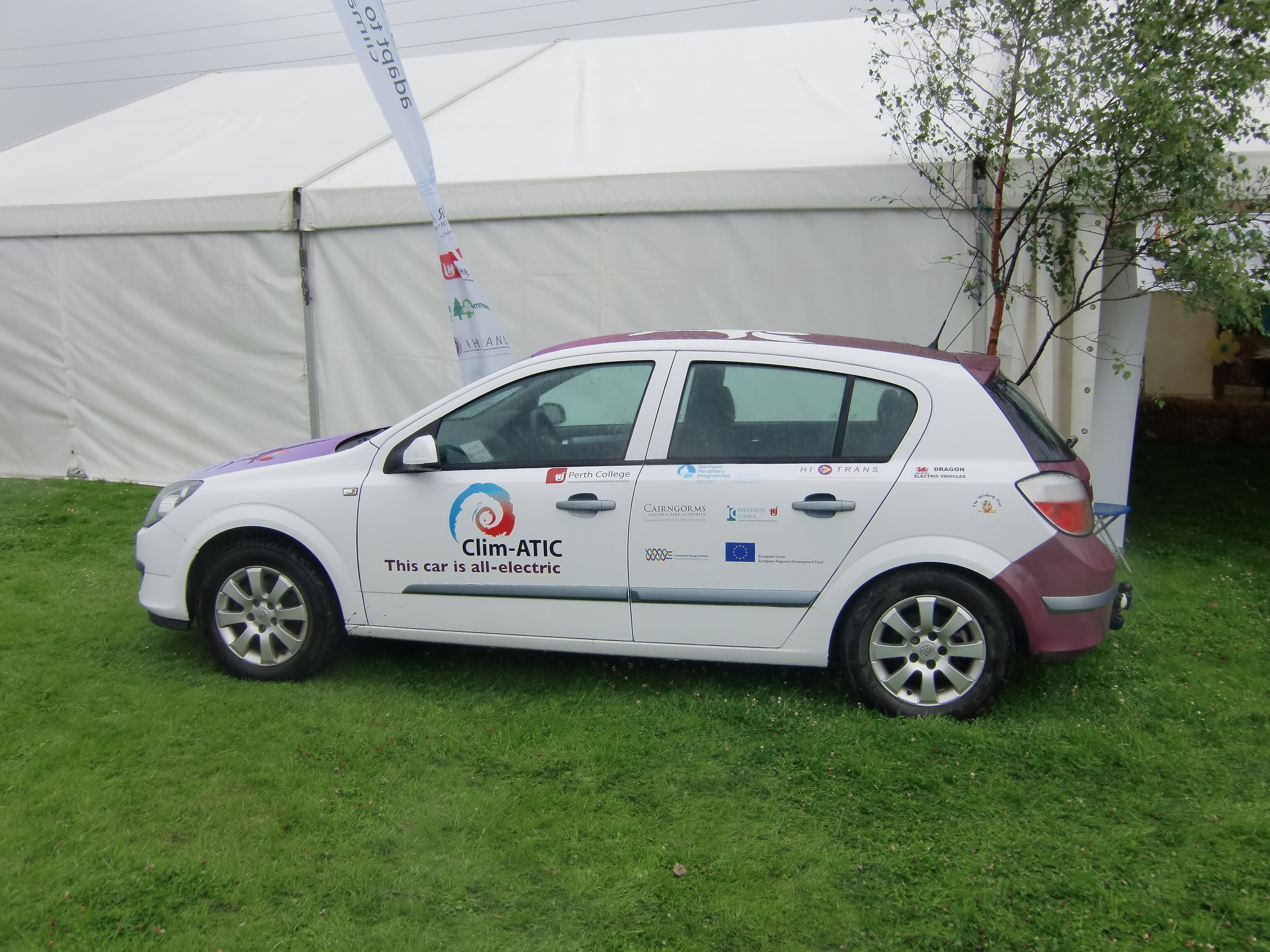
Electric Vauxhall run by the Cairngorms National Park Authority

Designated recharging points to run electric vehicles have been installed at the Cairngorms National Park Authority offices at Grantown and at the Aviemore offices of local charity, the Badenoch and Strathspey Community Transport Company. In 2010 the government body that manages and promotes sustainable transport in Scotland announced that, despite a goal of reducing carbon emissions for travel by staff by 8% over a two-year period, that they had risen by 3%. Transport Scotland has now set a new target of cutting their travel emissions by 12% over the next three years.

In 2011 Caledonian MacBrayne announced they were developing engineering concept designs for the world's first sea going RORO passenger hybrid (battery/diesel-electric) ferry. The ferries are designed for use on short crossing routes and use battery banks supplying a minimum of 20% of the energy consumed on board. MV Hallaig was launched in December 2012 at Ferguson's yard in Port Glasgow by Deputy First Minister Nicola Sturgeon. The Scottish Government invested more than £20 million in the project and Hallaig is the first of two vehicle roll-on roll-off hybrid-powered ferries. She has a low-carbon system of diesel electric and lithium-ion battery power.

== See also ==
- Community Energy Scotland
- EMEC
- Findhorn Ecovillage
- HICEC
- Renewable energy in Scotland
- Scoraig
- Centre for Alternative Technology
- Sustainable development
