= Climate change in Scotland =

Emissions, impacts and responses of Scotland related to climate change

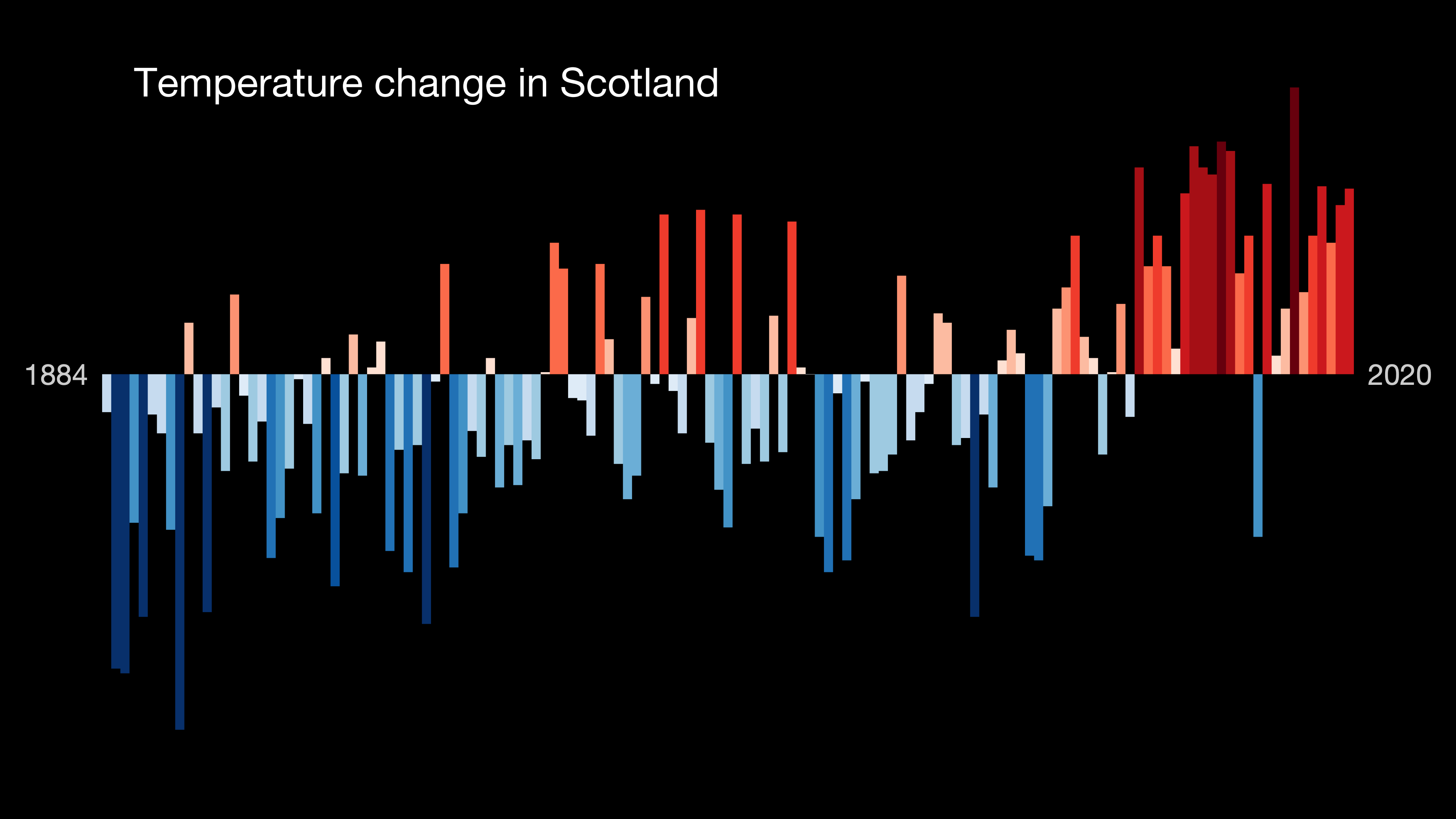
Average annual temperature anomaly in Scotland between 1884 and 2020

Climate change in Scotland is already causing a range of impacts on Scotland. 2022 was Scotland's warmest year on record with the temperature reaching 35°C in the Scottish Borders in July.

Climate change has already changed timings of spring events such as leaf unfolding, bird migration and egg-laying. Severe effects are likely to occur on biodiversity.

The mitigation of climate change and adaptation is a matter for the devolved Scottish Parliament.

== Greenhouse gas emissions ==
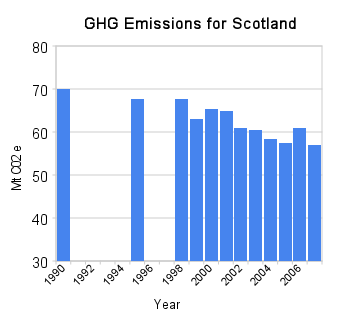

Scotland's greenhouse gas emissions only accounted for 10% of the UK's emissions in 2003, when figures were published. 37% of Scottish emissions are in energy supply and 17% in transport. Between 1990 and 2007, Scottish net emissions have reduced by 18.7%. The industrial processes sector had the largest decrease, of 72% with a reduction of 48% in the public sector trailing closely behind.

== Impacts on the natural environment ==
=== Temperature and weather changes ===
In Scotland, the effects of climate change can be seen in raised temperature changes, increased rainfall and less snow cover. These changes have a significant impact on the growing, breeding and migration seasons, as well as species abundance and diversity.

Current/past Köppen climate classification map for the United Kingdom for 1980–2016

Predicted Köppen climate classification map for the United Kingdom for 2071–2100

=== Ecosystems ===
Past observations have indicated some of the likely effects of climate change on biodiversity. Climate change has already changed timings of spring events such as leaf unfolding, bird migration and egg-laying. The population of species could change due to the speed at which they adapt.

Changes in the ranges of plant and animal species have been observed. New species may move to Scotland with the changing climate. Shifts may occur on hillsides and species that are already confined to high mountains may become extinct in Scotland.

Severe effects are likely to occur on biodiversity. Species of plants and animals that can't adapt quickly enough may become extinct or be replaced by other creatures. Coastal habitats, including machairs, may disappear due to high sea levels eroding the land. Salmon spawning beds may be wiped out by flash floods causing population problems for the species. There will be new risks to animals, plants and their habitats, including non-native pests and diseases.

When all these effects are combined with human response, such as land use change and the growth of new forests, Scotland's ecosystems could change drastically.

== Impacts on people ==
=== Health ===
The United Kingdom, along with Scotland, has experienced a significant increase in severe heat waves. Increasingly intense and prolonged heat periods can have dire health consequences. Extreme heat has already caused the death of people who would not have died without these weather events, especially in cities. Current knowledge regarding the exact number of heat-related deaths and hospital admissions for Scotland is very limited. It is estimated that there are 70 estimated heat-related deaths per year in Scotland. It is also assumed that impacts in southern Scotland may be similar to those observed in northern England. The number of deaths from heat are expected to rise in Scotland and the rest of the UK too.

=== Economic impacts ===
==== Agriculture ====
In some cases, Scottish agriculture may experience a positive change as summers will be warmer and drier. A higher yields and the possibility of new crops being able to grow in Scotland. However, soil quality would lower with heat and soil moisture stress. The availability of fresh water could cause problems for livestock. Heat stress with warmer and wetter conditions, livestock could face new diseases such as West Nile virus and outbreaks of bluetongue or parasites could increase.

== Mitigation and adaptation ==
=== Policies and regulation ===
==== Climate Change Act ====
The Climate Change (Scotland) Act 2009 is an Act passed by the Scottish Parliament. The Act includes an emissions target, set for the year 2050, for a reduction of at least 80% from the baseline year, 1990. The Climate Change (Scotland) Act 2009 was amended by the Climate Change (Emissions Reduction Targets) (Scotland) Act 2019, increasing the ambition of Scotland's emissions reduction targets to net zero by 2045 and revising interim and annual emissions reduction targets. Annual targets for greenhouse gas emissions must also be set, after consultation the relevant advisory bodies. Provisions are included in the Act for the creation of the Scottish Committee on Climate Change, as at present the only advisory body is the UK Committee on Climate Change. Ministers in parliament must now report on the progress of these targets. As of January 2011, public sector bodies in Scotland must comply with new guidelines set out by the Scottish Government.

==== Protection and enforcement ====
The Scottish Environment Protection Agency (SEPA) is Scotland's environmental regulator. SEPA's main role is in protecting and improving Scotland's natural environment. SEPA does this by helping communities, businesses and industries understand their legal and moral responsibilities they have relating to the environment.

SEPA recognises that climate change is the single greatest threat to our future. The organisation has produced its own climate change plan which contains details about how it will reduce its carbon emissions. This five year climate change plan introduces SEPA's specific role in climate change mitigation. SEPA, Scottish Natural Heritage (SNH), Forestry and Land Scotland (FLS), Scottish Forestry and Historic Environment Scotland are all government funded organisations with responsibilities for different aspects of Scotland's environment and heritage. A joint statement on climate change was created by all partners in 2009.

"The Scientific evidence is now overwhelming: climate change presents very serious global risks and it demands an urgent global response".

==== Afforestation ====
Afforestation efforts in Scotland have provided an increase in woodland expansion. By the 20th century mark, Scotland had diminished woodland coverage to 5% of Scotland's land area. However, by the early 21st century, afforestation efforts have increased woodland coverage to 17%. The Scottish government released their Draft Climate Change Plan in January 2017. The 2017 draft plan has increased the targeted woodland coverage to 21% by 2032 and increases the afforestation rate to 15,000 hectares per year.

=== Energy ===
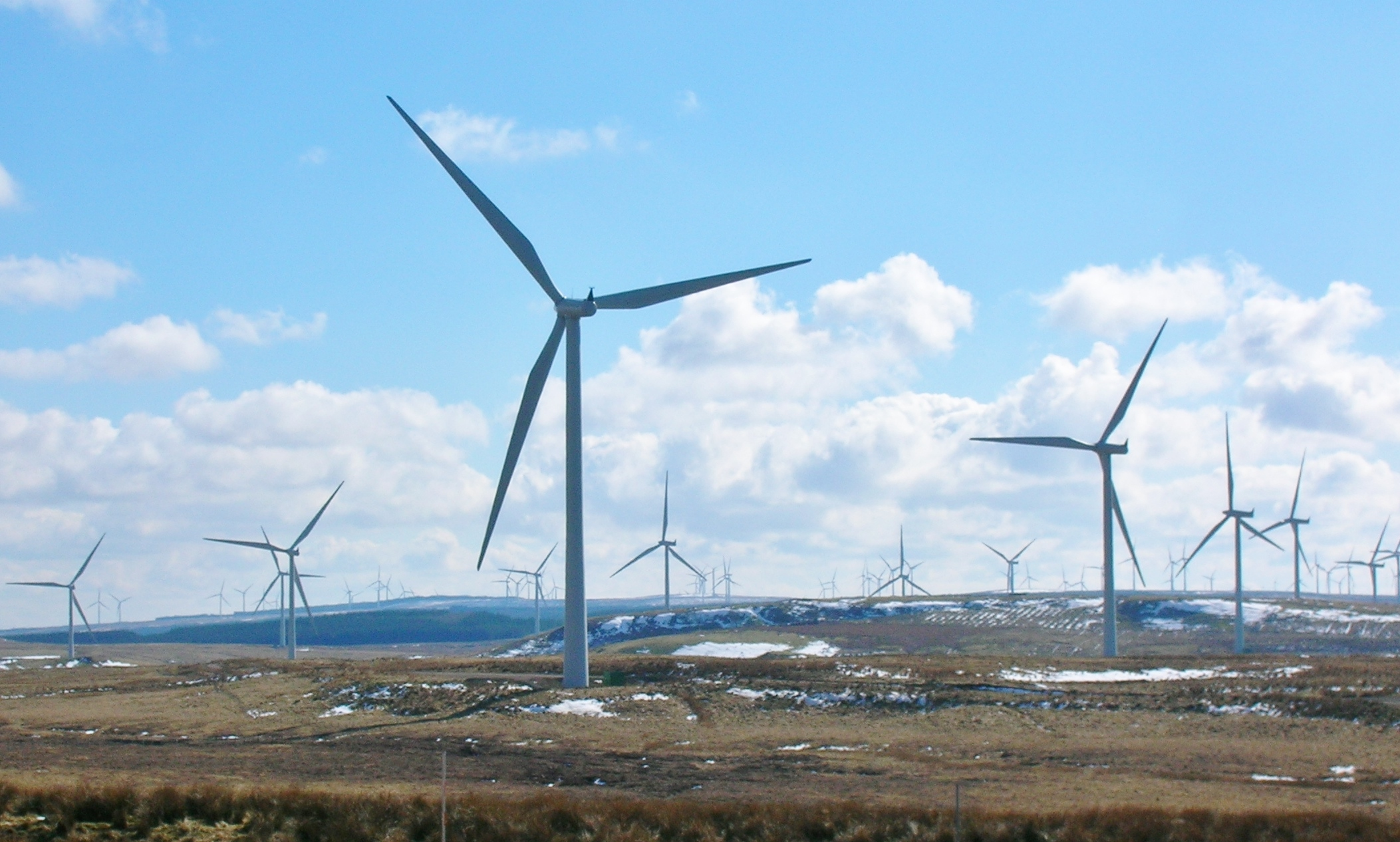
Whitelee Wind Farm is operated by Scottish Power Renewables and is the largest on-shore wind farm in the United Kingdom with a total capacity of 539 megawatts (MW).

The production of renewable energy in Scotland is a topic that came to the fore in technical, economic, and political terms during the opening years of the 21st century. The natural resource base for renewable energy is high by European, and even global standards, with the most important potential sources being wind, wave, and tide. Renewables generate almost all of Scotland's electricity, mostly from the country's wind power.

In 2020, Scotland had 12 gigawatts (GW) of renewable electricity capacity, which produced about a quarter of total UK renewable generation. In decreasing order of capacity, Scotland's renewable generation comes from onshore wind, hydropower, offshore wind, solar PV and biomass. Scotland exports much of this electricity. On 26 January 2024, the Scottish Government confirmed that Scotland generated the equivalent of 113% of Scotland's electricity consumption from renewable energy sources, making it the highest percentage figure ever recorded for renewable energy production in Scotland. It was hailed as "a significant milestone in Scotland's journey to net zero" by the Cabinet Secretary for Wellbeing Economy, Fair Work and Energy, Neil Gray. It becomes the first time that Scotland produced more renewable energy than it actually consumed, and demonstrates the "enormous potential of Scotland's green economy" as claimed by Gray.

Continuing improvements in engineering and economics are enabling more of the renewable resources to be used. Fears regarding fuel poverty and climate change have driven the subject high up the political agenda. In 2020 a quarter of total energy consumption, including heat and transportation, was met from renewables, and the Scottish government target is half by 2030. Although the finances of some projects remain speculative or dependent on market incentives, there has been a significant—and, in all likelihood, long-term—change in the underpinning economics.

In addition to planned increases in large-scale generating capacity using renewable sources, various related schemes to reduce carbon emissions are being researched. Although there is significant support from the public, private and community-led sectors, concerns about the effect of the technologies on the natural environment have been expressed. There is also a political debate about the relationship between the siting, and the ownership and control of these widely distributed resources.

=== International cooperation ===
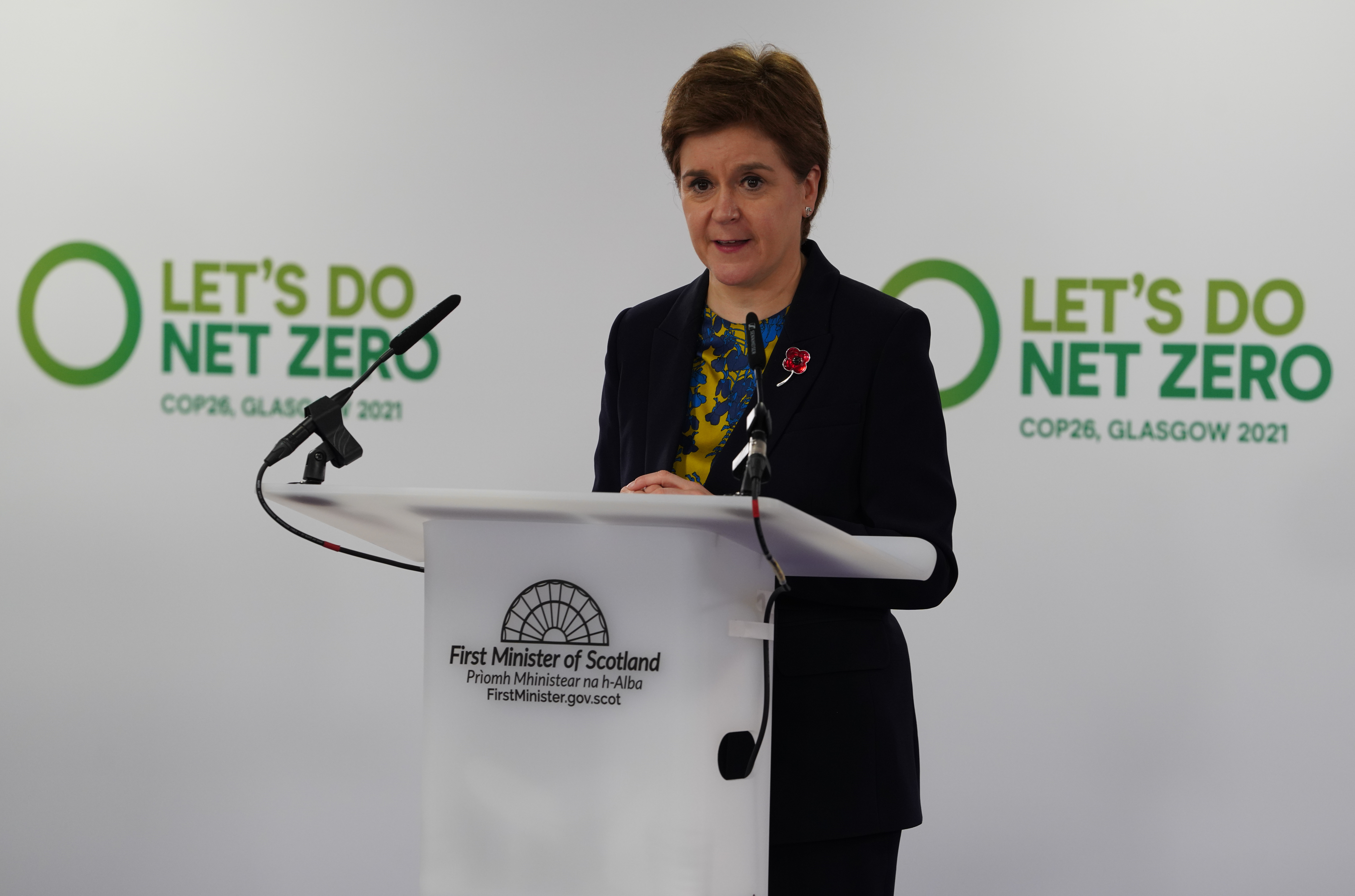
First Minister of Scotland Nicola Sturgeon speaking at a press conference ahead of COP26

During a 2017 visit to the United States, the first minister Nicola Sturgeon met Jerry Brown, Governor of California, where both signed an agreement committing both the Government of California and the Scottish Government to work together to tackle climate change.

The COP26 climate conference was held in Glasgow in 2021.

== See also ==
- Energy policy of Scotland
- Sustainable development in Scotland
- Climate change in the United Kingdom
- David Reay, a climate change scientist, author, and senior lecturer in carbon management at the University of Edinburgh
