= Global Forum on Migration and Development Civil Society Days =

The Global Forum on Migration and Development Civil Society Days is an annual meeting of civil society representatives held in conjunction with the Government Meeting of the Global Forum on Migration and Development.

== Background ==
The Global Forum on Migration and Development is an outcome of the 2006 UN High Level Dialogue on Migration and Development suggested by the UN Secretary General. The GFMD is open to any member state or observer of the United Nations as well as international organizations and civil society. The GFMD is outside of the UN program and is non-binding, completely voluntary process hosted by a different state each year.

The host state in turn selects a chair to organize and lead the event. The GFMD Civil Society Days are a parallel process to the government meetings and are led each year by a civil society partner selected by the chair. In the past five meetings, a range of topics have been discussed by governments and civil society including: global governance of migration, irregular migration, integration of migrants, discrimination, xenophobia, the feminization of migration, remittances, migrant rights, mobility, research, and data collection, to name a few. UN Secretary General appointed Peter Sutherland as the Secretary General's Special Representative on Migration and Development.

== Coordinating Office ==
The Civil Society Coordinating Office was created in 2011 to assume responsibility of the overall preparation and coordination of civil society activities. The International Catholic Migration Commission (ICMC) took the role of Coordinating Office in 2011 at the invitation of the Swiss Chair and will maintain its role to date.

=== GFMD Civil Society Coordinators ===
- Sweden 2013: ICMC
- Mauritius 2012: ICMC
- Geneva 2011: ICMC
- Puerto Vallarta 2010: Fundacion BBVA Bancomer
- Athens 2009: Alexander S. Onassis Public Benefit Foundation
- Manila 2008: Ayala Foundation
- Brussels 2007: King Baudouin Foundation

== Forum ==
The annual convening of the GFMD takes place over several days, the GFMD Civil Society Days are held immediately preceding the Government Meeting. Civil society and governments have separate, but tangential, agendas. The agendas are developed well in advance of the forum. Civil society bases its agenda off of recommendations from previous GFMDs, the current state agenda, and consultations with civil society actors. Each year the forum is typically divided into three major topics with roundtable meetings further dividing those three topics into smaller sessions.

=== Common Space ===
At the GFMD 2010 the Mexican Chair initiated a “Common Space” between civil society and governments. This allowed an interactive session between the two constituents who had previously been completely separated. The initiative was considered a success by both civil society and governments and was reprised at the GFMD 2011 in Geneva. The 2012 Mauritian Chair has stated that he wishes to continue to implement the Common Space at the 2012 GFMD.

== Future ==
The first UN High Level Dialogue on Migration and Development since the creation of the GFMD is being held at the United Nations Headquarters in New York City in 2013. Turkey will host the GFMD in 2015.
