= International migration =

Migration between countries

International migration occurs when people cross state boundaries and reside outside their country of nationality or birth. This encompasses individuals moving both permanently and temporarily, regardless of their legal status. Migration occurs for many reasons. Many people leave their home countries in order to look for economic opportunities in another country. Others migrate to be with family members who have migrated previously or because of political conditions in their countries. Education is another reason for international migration, as students pursue their studies abroad, although this migration is sometimes temporary, with a return to the home country after the studies are completed.

International migration is generally contrasted with internal migration.

== Categories of migrants ==
While there are several different potential systems for categorizing international migrants, one system organizes them into nine groups;

- temporary labor migrants
- irregular, illegal, or undocumented migrants
- highly skilled and business migrants
- refugees
- asylum seekers
- forced migration
- family members
- return migrants
- long-term, low-skilled migrants

These migrants can also be divided into two large groups, permanent and temporary. Permanent migrants intend to establish their permanent residence in a new country and possibly obtain that country's citizenship. Temporary migrants intend only to stay for limited periods of time, perhaps until the end of a particular program of study or for the duration of a their work contract or a certain work season. Both types of migrants have a significant effect on the economies and societies of the chosen destination country and the country of origin.

=== Countries receiving migrants ===
In recent decades, migration to nearly every Western country has risen sharply. The slopes of the tops of the differently-colored columns show the rate of percent increase in foreign-born people living in the respective countries.

Countries which receive migrants have been grouped by academics into four categories: traditional settlement countries, European countries which encouraged labour migration after World War II, European countries which receive a significant portion of their immigrant populations from their former colonies, and countries which formerly were points of emigration but have recently emerged as immigrant destinations. These countries are grouped according to a dichotomy, either migrant-sending or migrant-receiving countries, which have distinct governance issues. But this dichotomy is artificial, and it obscures issues from view, for example, when a net migrant-sending country is also a 'receiver' of migrants.

All things considered, countries like the UAE have the most comprehensive multicultural population, accounting for almost 84% of the total population. Not only United Arab Emirates (UAE), but countries like Qatar also has 74%, Kuwait has 60%, and Bahrain has 55% of their entire population are full of diverse people who emigrate from different countries such as (India, Bangladesh, and Pakistan) which increased population by 500% over the increase from 1.3 million in 1990 to 7.8 million in 2013.

Compared with the two governments in the United States, the Trump administration doubled the number of asylum and refugee seekers in the previous Obama administration by 12,000, and by 2020 it will only be 18,000. According to data from the immigration and border service, claims expected for this year will rise to almost three times those of previous years, while only less half than previous administrations have been accepted. The number of reports returned to the Obama administration is 110,000, reaching 368,000 by 2020.

In these countries, economic development enabled by remittances, transnational activism in support of outgoing migrant rights, as well as rights for incoming migrants are issues. As people began to immigrate to different countries to support them financially, they also contributed to their country's economy by sending their income as remittances. According to a report by the World Bank, officials said that people from different countries remitted nearly US$400 billion in 2015, and this is increasing every year, with an increase of 0.4%, reaching US$586 billion in the following year.

== Statistics ==
It has been predicted, that on average at least "50% of the world population would live in a foreign country" if restrictions of immigration were to be liberalised.

== Determinants ==
=== Lee's four categories ===
Everett Lee introduced a migration framework in 1966 that explains migration by four different categories. These four categories include origin, destination, "intervening obstacles" (such as laws or physical/cultural distance) and personal reasons. The final decision to move, according to Lee, is an individual response to positive, negative and neutral factors both at origin and destination as well as the ability to cope with "intervening obstacles".

==== Intervening obstacles ====
Intervening obstacles are those that cannot be measured by focusing on either origin or destination alone. These intervening obstacles include factors such as international treaties or distance—both physical and cultural. Even if two countries are physically far apart, migration between them can be intense if they share cultural traits. One of the most important cultural traits promoting migration is a shared language, which lowers the costs of migration.

=== The "push-pull" theory ===
Scholars observe a discrepancy between the "push-pull" narrative and original migration literature as Lee has never used the terms "push" or "pull" in his theory.

Push Factors

- Poor Medical Care
- Not enough jobs
- Few opportunities
- Primitive Conditions
- Political fear
- Fear of torture and mistreatment
- Religious discrimination
- Loss of wealth
- Natural disasters
- Bullying
- Lower chances of finding courtship

Pull Factors

- Chances of getting a job
- Better living standards
- Enjoyment
- Education
- Better Medical Care
- Security
- Family Links
- Lower Crime
- Better chances of finding courtship

== See also ==
- Criticisms of globalization
- Diaspora
- Emigration
- Global Compact for Migration
- Global Forum on Migration and Development
- Global labor arbitrage
- Human migration
- Return migration
- Immigration
- Opposition to immigration
- Transnationalism
- Xenophobia

== Bibliography ==
- Bello, Valeria (2017). International Migration and International Security: Why Prejudice is a Global Security Threat. Routledge. ISBN 9781138689473. OCLC 957742876.
