= Global Forum on Migration and Development =

Intergovernmental organization

Global Forum on Migration & Development Forum Mondial sur la Migration et le Developpement Foro Mundial sobre Migración y Desarrollo
- Official Logo
- Formation: 2006
- Type: Intergovernmental Process
- Headquarters: Geneva, Switzerland
- Members: Member States and Observers of the United Nations
- Official language: English, French and Spanish
- Host Country: Colombia (2024-25)
- Chair-in-Office: Gustavo Adolfo Gallón Giraldo, Ambassador, Colombia
- Website: http://www.gfmd.org

The Global Forum on Migration and Development (GFMD) is a state-led, informal and non-binding process, which helps shape the global debate on migration and development. It provides a flexible, multi-stakeholder space where governments can discuss the multi-dimensional aspects, opportunities and challenges related to migration, development, and the link between these two areas. The GFMD process allows governments - in partnership with civil society, the private sector, the UN system, and other relevant stakeholders – to analyze and discuss sensitive issues, create consensus, pose innovative solutions, and share policy and practices.

== Background ==
The idea of creating a global consultative forum on Migration and Development was proposed by Mr. Kofi Annan, former Secretary-General of the United Nations (UN), at the first High-Level Dialogue on International Migration and Development (HLD) held on 14–15 September 2006 during the UN General Assembly. During the HLD, over 140 Member States discussed the interaction between migration and development, a complex relationship of growing importance in view of the increasing migration flows. Yet there was still a crippling lack of information and data and appropriate institutional structures and resources in many countries to achieve these; and importantly, "there was no single, all-encompassing global forum to bring together policy makers on the two critical issues of migration and development". Some good practices were tried in a piecemeal way by governments and international agencies around the world, but these needed to be more widely understood and adapted, and more cooperative frameworks needed to be explored.

Reflecting the progressive acknowledgement of the limits of a strictly national approach to migration questions at a global level, there was widespread recognition and support in the UN at the HLD 2006 for an "open and transparent dialogue on migration and development" in an "informal, non-binding and state-led framework" that would promote "practical, evidence-based outcomes and cooperation" between governments as well as non-government stakeholders.

From this idea, the GFMD was born, hosting its first Summit meeting in 2007 under the direction of the first GFMD Chair, Belgium. The GFMD has since remained as the largest "informal, non-binding, voluntary and government-led process", bringing together expertise from all regions and countries at all stages of economic, social and political development. Since its inception, the GFMD has operated on the basis of a unique participative working method, involving governments and policy makers from a varied background. Policy-makers from a wide range of government agencies participate, including from Ministries and Departments of Immigration, Development, Labor, Foreign Affairs, Gender Equality, Home Affairs, Justice, Interior, Integration and Nationals Abroad.

Consistent with its state-led but not state only nature, the GFMD has also established formal links with other processes such as the GFMD Civil Society, the GFMD Business Mechanism and the Mayors Mechanism. These institutional links have allowed the "inclusion of the voices and expertise of diverse stakeholders", including academia, NGOs, trade unions, the private sector, migrants and diaspora representatives as well as local authorities, in GFMD discussions.

== Objectives ==
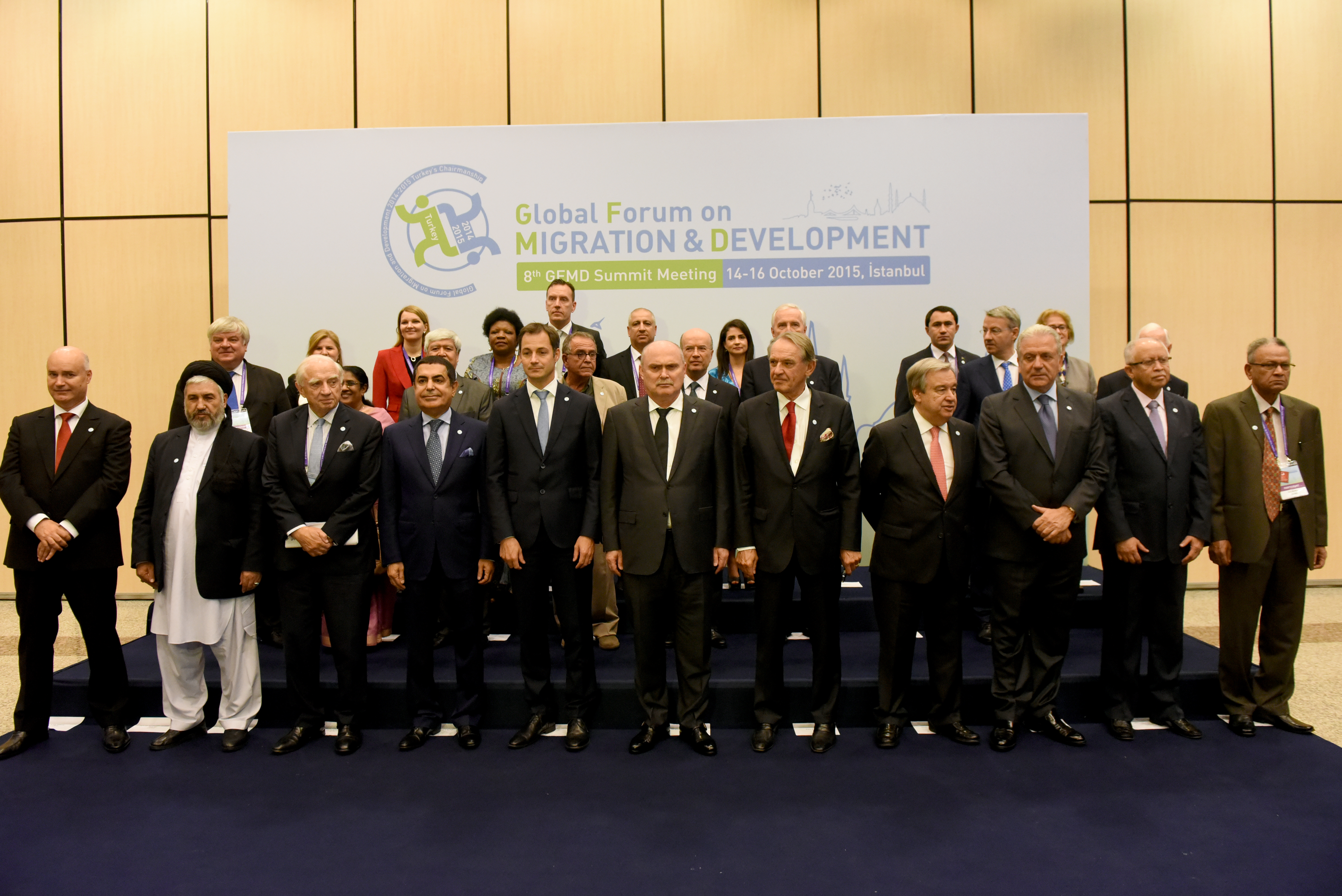
Family photo of the Global Forum on Migration and Development in Istanbul, Turkey

The objectives of the GFMD are:

- To provide a venue for policy-makers and high-level policy practitioners to informally discuss relevant policies and practical challenges and opportunities of the migration-development nexus, and engage with other stakeholders, including non-governmental organizations, experts and migrant organizations to foster practical and action-oriented outcomes at national, bilateral and international level;
- To exchange good practices and experiences, which can be duplicated or adapted in other circumstances, in order to maximize the development benefits of migration and migration flows;
- To identify information, policy and institutional gaps necessary to foster synergies and greater policy coherence at national, regional and international levels between the migration and development policy areas;
- To establish partnerships and cooperation between countries, and between countries and other stakeholders, such as international organizations, diaspora, migrants, academia etc., on migration and development;
- To structure the international priorities and agenda on migration and development.

== Structure ==
Under the Operating Modalities of the GFMD adopted in 2007, the Forum meets every year for an inter-active and practice-oriented dialogue. It is attended by high-level and senior government policy-makers, and its deliberations are held under Chatham House Rules. A Report of Proceedings is prepared at the end of each Forum.

The supporting framework of the GFMD includes the following:

- The Chair-in-Office: The host government assumes responsibility for the preparatory process and the implementation of each Forum. The Chair also supervises the GFMD Support Unit. The current GFMD Chair is the Government of Ecuador.
- The Troika: composed of the outgoing chair, the current chair, and the forthcoming chair.
- The Steering Group: composed of a smaller number of governments that are firmly committed to offer sustained political and conceptual support to the Forum process and to the Chair-in-Office, and to ensure continuity of the process. The Steering Group meets at regular intervals in Geneva to consider and advise on all relevant policy issues pertaining to the smooth running of the Forum process. It may also create thematic follow-up working groups.

Steering Group Members:

1. Australia
2. Azerbaijan
3. Bangladesh
4. Belgium
5. Canada
6. Ecuador
7. Egypt
8. France
9. Germany
10. Ghana
11. Greece
12. India
13. Indonesia
14. Kenya
15. Mexico
16. Morocco
17. Philippines
18. Portugal
19. Senegal
20. Spain
21. Sweden
22. Switzerland
23. Thailand
24. Turkey
25. United Arab Emirates
- The Friends of the Forum: open to all UN Member States and Observers. It acts as a sounding board by ensuring that all Members States and Observers of the UN are kept abreast of Forum-related developments; and advises on the agenda, structure and format of the GFMD meeting. Friends of the Forum Meetings are held, in principle, at least twice in between each Forum meeting at a venue to be determined by the Chair-in-Office.

GFMD Governments:

1. Afghanistan
2. Albania
3. Algeria
4. Andorra
5. Angola
6. Antigua and Barbuda
7. Argentina
8. Armenia
9. Australia
10. Austria
11. Azerbaijan
12. Bahamas
13. Bahrain
14. Bangladesh
15. Barbados
16. Belarus
17. Belgium
18. Belize
19. Benin
20. Bhutan
21. Bolivia
22. Bosnia and Herzegovina
23. Botswana
24. Brazil
25. Brunei
26. Bulgaria
27. Burkina Faso
28. Burundi
29. Cape Verde
30. Cambodia
31. Cameroon
32. Canada
33. Central African Republic
34. Chad
35. Chile
36. China
37. Colombia
38. Comoros
39. Congo
40. Democratic Republic of the Congo
41. Costa Rica
42. Côte d'Ivoire
43. Croatia
44. Cuba
45. Cyprus
46. Czech Republic
47. Denmark
48. Djibouti
49. Dominica
50. Dominican Republic
51. Ecuador
52. Egypt
53. El Salvador
54. Equatorial Guinea
55. Eritrea
56. Estonia
57. Eswatini
58. Ethiopia
59. Fiji
60. Finland
61. France
62. Gabon
63. Gambia
64. Georgia
65. Germany
66. Ghana
67. Greece
68. Grenada
69. Guatemala
70. Guinea
71. Guinea-Bissau
72. Guyana
73. Haiti
74. Holy See
75. Honduras
76. Hungary
77. Iceland
78. India
79. Indonesia
80. Iran
81. Iraq
82. Ireland
83. Italy
84. Jamaica
85. Japan
86. Jordan
87. Kazakhstan
88. Kenya
89. Kiribati
90. South Korea
91. Kuwait
92. Kyrgyzstan
93. Laos
94. Latvia
95. Lebanon
96. Lesotho
97. Liberia
98. Libya
99. Liechtenstein
100. Lithuania
101. Luxembourg
102. Madagascar
103. Malawi
104. Malaysia
105. Maldives
106. Mali
107. Malta
108. Marshall Islands
109. Mauritania
110. Mauritius
111. Mexico
112. Micronesia
113. Moldova
114. Monaco
115. Mongolia
116. Montenegro
117. Morocco
118. Mozambique
119. Myanmar
120. Namibia
121. Nauru
122. Nepal
123. North Macedonia
124. Netherlands
125. New Zealand
126. Nicaragua
127. Niger
128. Nigeria
129. Norway
130. Oman
131. Pakistan
132. Palau
133. Palestine
134. Panama
135. Papua New Guinea
136. Paraguay
137. Peru
138. Philippines
139. Poland
140. Portugal
141. Qatar
142. Romania
143. Russia
144. Rwanda
145. Saint Kitts and Nevis
146. Saint Lucia
147. Saint Vincent and the Grenadines
148. Samoa
149. San Marino
150. São Tomé and Príncipe
151. Saudi Arabia
152. Senegal
153. Serbia
154. Seychelles
155. Sierra Leone
156. Singapore
157. Slovakia
158. Slovenia
159. Solomon Islands
160. Somalia
161. South Africa
162. South Sudan
163. Spain
164. Sri Lanka
165. Sudan
166. Suriname
167. Sweden
168. Switzerland
169. Tajikistan
170. Tanzania
171. Thailand
172. Timor-Leste
173. Togo
174. Tonga
175. Trinidad and Tobago
176. Tunisia
177. Turkey
178. Turkmenistan
179. Tuvalu
180. Uganda
181. Ukraine
182. United Arab Emirates
183. United Kingdom
184. Uruguay
185. Uzbekistan
186. Vanuatu
187. Venezuela
188. Viet Nam
189. Yemen
190. Zambia
191. Zimbabwe

Former members

1. Israel
2. United States

GFMD Observers:

1. ACP Group of States
2. ACP-EU Migration Action
3. African Development Bank
4. African Union
5. Asian Development Bank
6. Association of Southeast Asian Nations
7. Committee on the Protection of the Rights of All Migrant Workers and Members of their Families
8. Common Market for Eastern and Southern Africa
9. Commonwealth Secretariat (Commonwealth)
10. European Union
11. Food and Agriculture Organization
12. India Centre for Migration
13. Inter-American Conference on Social Security
14. Inter-American Development Bank
15. Intergovernmental Consultations on Migration, Asylum and Refugees
16. International Catholic Migration Commission
17. International Center for Migration Policy Development
18. International Committee of the Red Cross
19. International Federation of Red Cross and Red Crescent Societies
20. International Fund for Agricultural Development
21. International Labour Organization
22. International Organisation of Employers
23. International Organization for Migration
24. International Organization of the Francophonie
25. Latin American and Caribbean Economic System
26. League of Arab States
27. Mayors Mechanism
28. Migrant Forum in Asia
29. Office of the High Commissioner for Human Rights
30. Organisation for Economic Co-operation and Development
31. Organization for Security and Cooperation in Europe
32. Organization of Islamic Conference
33. Overseas Development Institute
34. Partners in Population and Development
35. Platform on Disaster Displacement
36. Regional Conference on Migration (Puebla Process)
37. Secretaría General Iberoamericana
38. South American Conference on Migration
39. Sovereign Military Order of Malta
40. The John D. and Catherine T. MacArthur Foundation
41. UN Network on Migration
42. United Nations Alliance of Civilizations
43. United Nations Children's Fund
44. United Nations Conference on Trade and Development
45. United Nations Department of Economic and Social Affairs
46. United Nations Development Programme
47. United Nations Educational, Scientific and Cultural Organization
48. United Nations Economic and Social Commission for Asia and the Pacific
49. United Nations High Commissioner for Refugees
50. United Nations Human Security Unit
51. United Nations Institute for Training and Research
52. United Nations Office at Geneva
53. United Nations Office on Drugs and Crime
54. United Nations Population Fund
55. United Nations Programme for Human Settlements
56. United Nations Regional Commissions
57. United Nations Special Rapporteur on the Human Rights of Migrants
58. United Nations University
59. UN Women
60. Universal Postal Union
61. World Bank
62. World Health Organization
- The Chair's Taskforce: gives political, conceptual and operational advice to the chair, composed of: national government staff from different ministries and departments and a limited number of international advisers sponsored by other governments or international organizations.
- The GFMD Support Unit: created in 2008 to perform administrative, financial and logistical functions; manage GFMD-related data and information; manage internationally contributed funds; and operate the GFMD website and the GFMD Platform for Partnerships (the latter since 2010).
- The Global Network of GFMD Focal Points: created in 2007 to facilitate further dialogue at the national level, as well as networking at the global level between GFMD governments.
- The GFMD government-led Working Groups, established by the Steering Group, which prioritize and follow up on outcomes of previous GFMD meetings and link these to current and future thematic priorities.
- The UN Migration Network, brings together 38 UN entities (as of December 2018) to ensure effective, timely and coordinated system-wide support to Member States. Building on GFMD's close working relationship with UN entities dealing with migration and development, particularly IOM, the GFMD is poised to coordinate closely with the UN Network on Migration (and its member UN entities) to promote thematic synergy and coherent work planning. While in the past, the primary connection between the GFMD and the UN was through the UN Secretary General's Special Representative for International Migration (SRSG), it will now be through the UN Network.

== Past GFMD Chairs in Office ==
The host country (Chair-in-Office) assumes responsibility for the preparatory process and the implementation of each Forum. The host government chairs all sessions related to Forum preparations and chairs the Forum. The Chair-in-Office is assisted by the country that organized the previous Forum and the country that will host the following meeting of the Forum.

- Belgium 2007 : Régine de Clercq, former Ambassador for Migration and Asylum Policy of Belgium, who also acted as the Belgian Executive Director of the Global Forum on Migration and Development.
- Philippines 2008: Esteban B. Conejos Jr., Undersecretary for Migrant Workers' Affairs of the Philippine Department of Foreign Affairs. He was the Philippine GFMD focal point and Secretary General of the GFMD National Organizing Committee.
- Greece 2009: Mrs. Theodora Tzakri, Deputy Minister of Interior, Decentralization and E-Governance, chaired the Athens GFMD meeting.
- Mexico 2010: Ambassador Juan Manuel Gómez Robledo, Undersecretary for Multilateral Affairs and Human Rights of the Mexican Ministry of Foreign Affairs initially acted as chair. Mrs. Cecilia Romero Castillo, then Commissioner of INM, acted as executive director. On 7 October, she was succeeded by Mr. Salvador Beltrán del Rio Madrid. In late October 2010, Amb Julián Ventura Valero, Undersecretary for North America at the SRE, took over the role of the GFMD Chair after Amb Gómez Robledo.
- Switzerland 2011: Ambassador Eduard Gnesa, Swiss Special Ambassador for International Cooperation in Migration.
- Mauritius 2012: Mr. Ali Mansoor, Financial Secretary of the Ministry of Finance and Economic Development (MOFED) of the Republic of Mauritius.
- Sweden 2013-2014: Mrs. Eva Åkerman Börje, Ambassador, Government Offices of Sweden.
- Turkey 2014-2015: H.E. Feridun Hadi Sinirlioğlu, Minister of Foreign Affairs of Turkey. The preparatory meetings were chaired alternately by Mr. Mehmet Samsar, Director General for Consular Affairs of the Turkish Ministry of Foreign Affairs and Ms. Esen Altug, Deputy Director General for Migration, Asylum and Visa of the Turkish Ministry of Foreign Affairs.
- Bangladesh 2016: H.E. Amb. Md. Shahidul Haque, Foreign Secretary of Bangladesh
- Germany-Morocco 2017-2018: Co-Chaired by Mr. Götz Schmidt-Bremme, Ambassador for the 2017-2018 GFMD at the German Federal Foreign Office and Mr. El Habib Nadir, Secretary General at the Ministry in charge of Moroccans living abroad and migration affairs.
- Ecuador 2019: Mr. Santiago Javier Chavez Pareja, Vice Minister for Human Mobility of Ecuador

== Other GFMD Mechanisms ==
- GFMD Civil Society
- GFMD Business Mechanism
- GFMD Mayors Mechanism

== The Platform for Partnerships (PfP) ==
Since the creation of the GFMD in 2007, there have been continued calls during the annual GFMD meetings for online sharing of good practices using the GFMD website. At the initiative of the Mexican Chair and with the support of the current Swiss Chair the PfP has been created towards the end of 2010 to address this need and to foster new partnerships.

The GFMD Platform for Partnerships (PfP - www.gfmd.org/pfp) is a tool to facilitate exchange and showcase projects, programs and policies that are undertaken by governments in the field of Migration and Development (M&D), and which are related to GFMD themes, debates and outcomes. The PfP is a four-pronged tool:

- for showcasing existing (or past) practices (M&D Policy and Practice Database)
- for fostering new projects and partnerships (M&D Calls for Action)
- for facilitating communication and exchange (M&D Networking)
- for showcasing products and policy tools (M&D Policy Tools)

== See also ==
- GFMD Civil Society Process
- Global Migration Group
- KNOMAD
