= KNOMAD =

World bank initiative

The Global Knowledge Partnership on Migration and Development (KNOMAD) is an initiative of the World Bank that describes itself as "envisaged to be a global hub of knowledge and policy expertise on migration and development issues." The goal is to have it work in close collaboration with the Global Forum on Migration and Development and the Global Migration Group.

== History ==
KNOMAD grew out of the World Bank's earlier efforts to compile data on migration and remittances; the goal with KNOMAD was to make the process more systematic and encompass a wider range of measures related to migration. KNOMAD's inception phase was from May 2011 to April 2013. During this time, it held consultations with governments, civil society organizations, the private sector, and academics. It organized global experts' meetings in December 2012 in Geneva and Washington, D.C. As part of the inception process, Dilip Ratha, KNOMAD's CEO, shared thoughts on KNOMAD's role in shaping future policy in a blog post for the World Bank's People Move blog. In 2015, KNOMAD also launched its interactive online data portal, offering free access to migration indicators and remittance flows at country and regional levels.

KNOMAD was announced by the World Bank on April 19, 2013. KNOMAD, funded through a mix of World Bank budget allocations and donor grants, partners with governments, academia, and civil society to pilot regional migration compacts. It entered a five-year implementation phase in May 2013, and has gone on to collaborate with diverse organizations such as the Organisation for Economic Co-operation and Development (Paris workshop, December 2013), and the United Nations Development Programme (specifically, the United Nations Institute for Training and Research). Additionally, during the COVID-19 pandemic, KNOMAD issued rapid-response analyses on diaspora engagement and remittance resilience, enforcing the emergency policy measures set in place by the governments. Since the epidemic, a number of seminars, conferences, and workshops have been held by KNOMAD in collaboration with other agencies and institutions to further its agenda.

== Funding ==
The KNOMAD is funded by a multi-donor trust fund set up by the World Bank. The largest contributors are the Swiss Agency for Development and Cooperation and the Federal Ministry of Economic Cooperation and Development (Germany).

== People ==
Dilip Ratha, the CEO of KNOMAD, is also Manager of the Migration and Remittances Unit of the Migrating out of Poverty initiative of the Department for International Development in the United Kingdom, as well as the host of the People Move blog of the World Bank.

== Research areas ==
KNOMAD has working groups in the following twelve areas:

1. Data on migration and remittance flows: The focus here is on improving the availability, accessibility, and scope of data collection as well as establishing and harmonizing data and quality standards.
2. Skilled labor migration: The focus here is on understanding how skilled migration can best support development, in addition to how the human capital of workers can be augmented in both sending and receiving countries.
3. Low-skilled labor migration: The focus here is on determining the appropriate mix of policies affecting low-skilled migration, both temporary and permanent. This enables insight into determining how low-skilled migration interacts with regional integration, as well as understanding the implications of low-skilled migration for social and economic development.
4. Integration issues in host communities: The focus here is on understanding what categories of migrants should be targeted by integration policies, how integration policies can best be designed to meet stakeholders' needs and values of diversity and freedom, and how integration affects development in sending countries through remittances.
5. Policy and institutional coherence:
6. Migration, security and development
7. Migrant rights and social aspects of migration
8. Demographic changes and migration
9. Remittances, including access to finance and capital markets
10. Mobilizing diaspora resources as agents of social and economic change
11. Environmental change and migration
12. Internal migration and urbanization

It also identifies four cross-cutting themes for its work:

The four cross-cutting themes are:

1. Gender.
2. Monitoring and impact evaluation.
3. Capacity building.
4. Public perceptions and communications.
