= Dilip Ratha =

Indian American Economist and scholar

- Born: Sindhekela
- Education: (B.A.) Ravenshaw University (M.A.) Jawaharlal Nehru University (PhD) Indian Statistical Institute
- Occupations: CEO, KNOMAD – World Bank
- Parent: Gopal Ratha (Father)
- Website: DilipRatha.com

Dilip Ratha is an Indian American economist and scholar of international migration and its relationship with global development. He is known for his role in adding remittances to discussions of migration and development, starting around 2003.

== Personal life ==
Dilip was born in Sindhekela, Balangir, Odisha, India. He ended his school education early, and left his village to pursue higher studies and then he completed his undergrad from Ravenshaw University and his Master of Arts in Economics from Jawaharlal Nehru University. He completed his PhD in economics from the Indian Statistical Institute. He later joined the World Bank and moved to the United States.

== Professional life ==
Ratha heads KNOMAD, a World Bank initiative organizing data and knowledge on migration. He also hosts and blogs at the World Bank People Move blog, heads the Migration and Remittances Unit at the Migrating Out of Poverty Initiative of the Department for International Development of the United Kingdom, and has authored content for the Migration Policy Institute.

== Media coverage ==
Dilip Ratha's professional work and personal journey as a migrant was profiled in The New York Times in 2008. He has also been cited and quoted in The New York Times, The Wall Street Journal The Washington Post, and Forbes.
