= CIFAL =

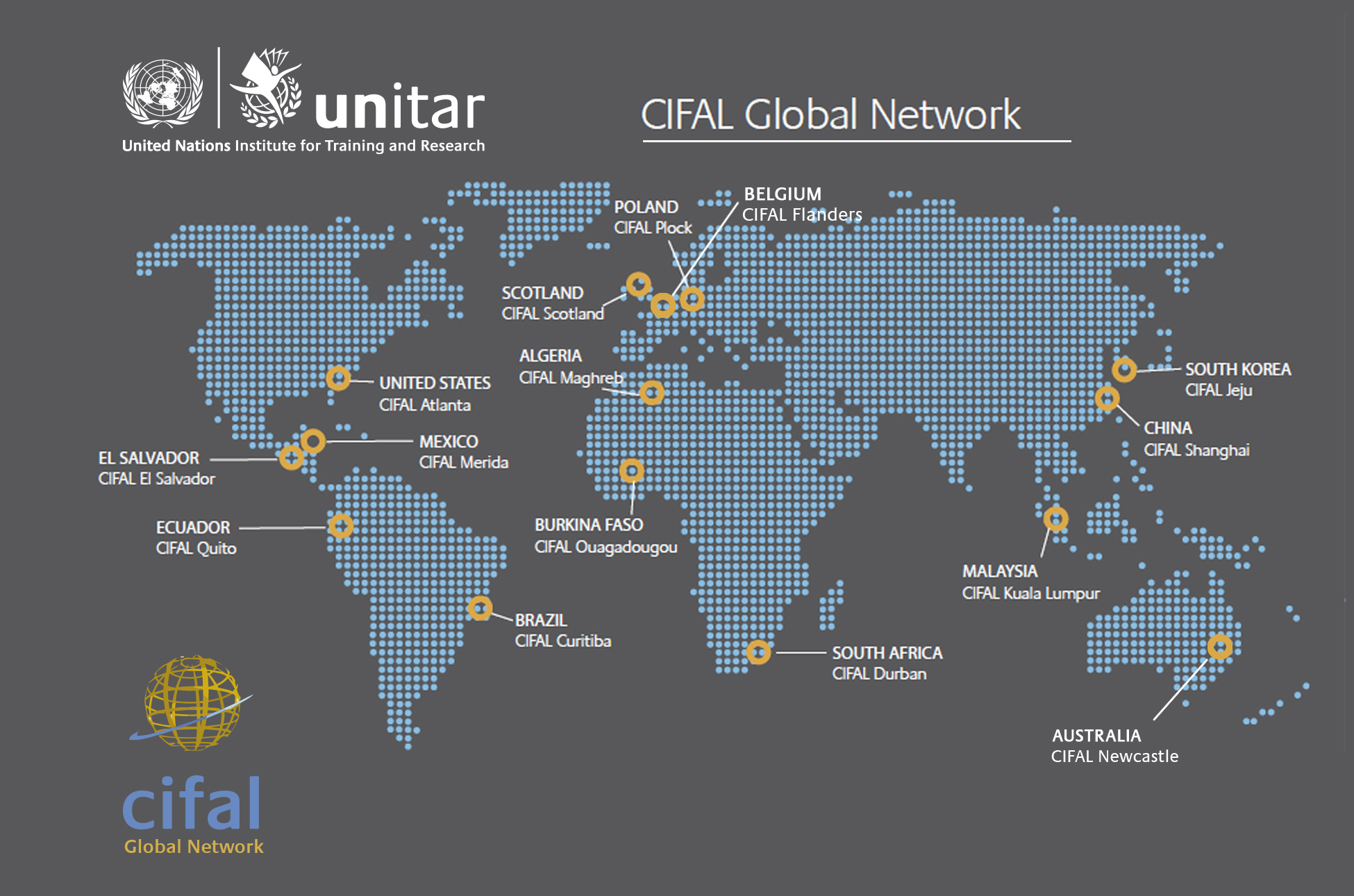
CIFAL Centres Around the World

The CIFAL Global Network is part of the United Nations Institute for Training and Research (UNITAR). The Network comprises 30 International Training Centres (CIFALs) and aims to serve as a platform for capacity-building of government authorities and civil society leaders on topics related to sustainable development, as well as on global mandates and goals of the United Nations. Since its inception in 2003, the Network has trained more than 60,000 beneficiaries through over 600 training and knowledge-sharing events (as of December 2015). It reached more than 10,000 beneficiaries from 75 countries in 2015.

The acronym CIFAL stands for "International Training Centre for Authorities and Leaders" (French: Centre international de formation des autorités et leaders or in Spanish: Centro Internacional de Formación para Autoridades y Lideres). Each CIFAL Centre is a hub for capacity building and knowledge sharing between local and regional authorities, national governments, international organisations, the private sector, and civil society. It is an important resource in the United Nations long-term efforts towards the achievement of the Sustainable Development Goals.

== Approach ==
The central purpose of CIFAL's training programmes is to develop and strengthen human capacities to better respond to development challenges. CIFAL Centres rely on a facilitative approach that aims to:

- Facilitate the transfer of knowledge, experiences and best practices amongst government officials, private sector and civil society leaders
- Enhance capabilities to effectively perform relevant tasks
- Encourage cooperation and the development of multi-stakeholder partnerships
- Provide networking opportunities leading to city-to-city collaboration
- Contribute to the development of local and national strategies

Each of its learning and training activities present a variety of learning resources blending core content, assignments, tasks, assessments, peer-to-peer collaboration, interactive activities, and mentoring. Depending on the needs of the beneficiaries and the objectives of the training, activities are delivered in different formats: face-to-face, virtually, or blended, combining both.

== Work ==
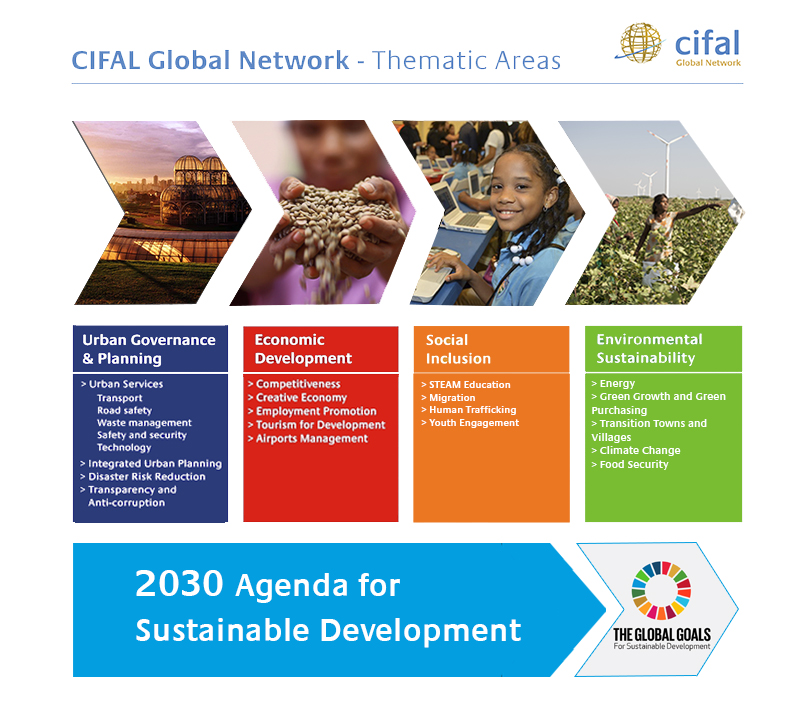
CGN Thematic Areas

As of 2026, the CIFAL Global Network comprises 30 centres across Africa, Asia, Europe, Australia and the Americas. Each CIFAL provides innovative training on key areas related to sustainable development and serves as hubs for the exchange of knowledge amongst government officials, non-governmental and international organizations, the private sector, civil society, academic institutions and the UN system.

Each CIFAL is specialized in thematic areas that are defined by the needs and priorities of the regions they serve. The thematic areas include:

- Urban Governance and Planning
- Economic Development
- Social Inclusion
- Environmental Sustainability
- Capacity for Agenda 2030 for Sustainable Development

The CIFAL Global Network also plays a key role in building capacity for the implementation of the Agenda 2030 for Sustainable Development.

Their training programmes provide access to knowledge, resources and best practices, while promoting multi-stakeholder collaboration in support of sustainable development.
