= United Nations System Staff College =

Institute of the United Nations

Coordinates: 45.024249°N 7.672955°E

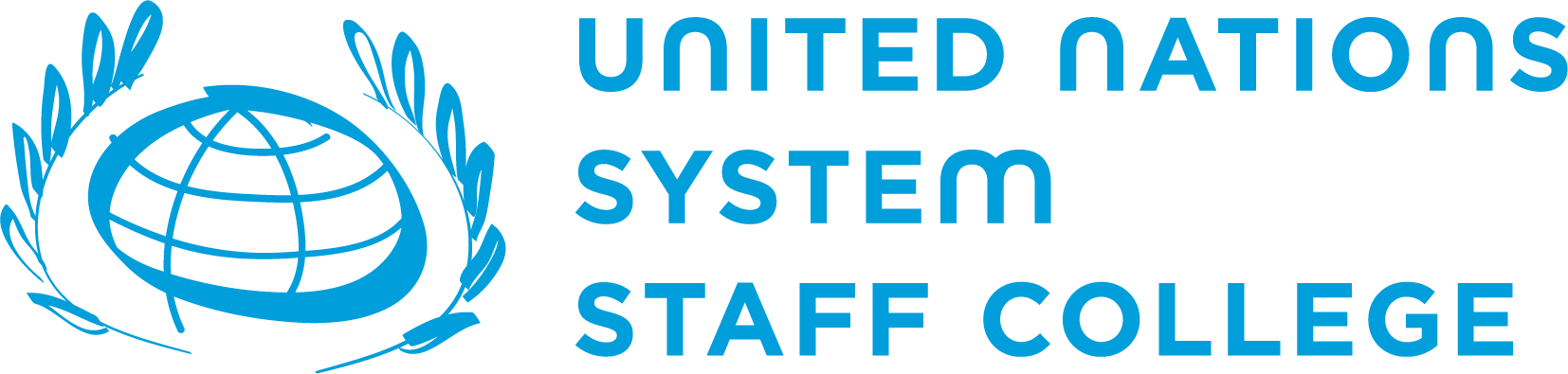
- Abbreviation: UNSSC
- Formation: 1 January 2002; 24 years ago
- Type: Research and training institute
- Legal status: Active
- Headquarters: Turin, Italy
- Head: Director (Acting); Miguel Panadero
- Parent organization: United Nations General Assembly; United Nations Economic and Social Council
- Website: www.unssc.org

The United Nations System Staff College (UNSSC) is a UN organization that serves the personnel of the United Nations and its affiliates via inter-agency learning and training.

== History ==
In 1993, Secretary-General Boutros-Ghali created a joint United Nations-International Labour Organization team to seriously consider the creation of a staff college, tasking it with creating a concrete proposal. The proposal of the team was accepted in 1995. A UN Staff College Project was inaugurated in 1997 at the ILO Turin Campus, with an inaugural workshop organized by the UN Office for the Coordination of Humanitarian Affairs and United Nations Development Programme, opened by Secretary-General Annan on 12 April 1997. The subject of the DHA-UNDP Workshop was "Building Bridges between Relief and Development", 12 to 17 April 1997, and it coincided with a meeting of the heads of UN agencies, the United Nations Chief Executives' Board for Coordination (CEB) (then known as the Advisory Committee on Coordination) who attended the inauguration. Based on experience of training activities over the following years, an independent team evaluated the plan for the college in August 2000 and recommended that the United Nations formally draw up a statute for the formal creation of the staff college.

The college was formally created by the General Assembly on 20 December 2000 via Res. 55/207. This resolution called for "an institution for system-wide knowledge management, training and learning for the staff of the United Nations system". It also specified that special attention be paid to the areas of economic and social development, peace and security and the internal management of the United Nations system.

On 12 July 2001, the General Assembly approved the Statute of the College via Res. 55/278. This statute laid out the College's objectives, governance structure, finances, and staffing criteria, among other things.

The General Assembly adopted Res. 80/L.112 on 3 September 2026 which put in process a merger of UNSSC into the United Nations Institute for Training and Research (UNITAR) by 1 January 2027. Following this merger UNITAR will also be renamed to the United Nations Institute for Capability and Learning Innovation (UNICLI).

== Campuses ==
The Turin Campus serves as the UNSSC Headquarters, offering learning and training programmes focused in the areas of leadership and management, and peace and security.

The UNSSC Bonn Office focuses on developing learning opportunities in the areas of sustainable development, change management and organizational development, and advancing academic partnerships.
