= Good Morning Gloucester =

The Good Morning Gloucester logo.

Good Morning Gloucester is a longstanding blog created by Gloucester, Massachusetts lobster broker Joey Ciaramitaro. GMG is a snapshot of living and working on the docks of the oldest commercial fishing harbor in the United States.

== History ==
Good Morning Gloucester began as a daily post on the Cape Ann Online message board. Joey Ciaramitaro would post photographs that he took while walking to the docks before dawn each morning. This thread became unmanageably long and was moved over to a blog in December 2007. Within a year it was recording more than 30,000 visits per month which made it the most active blog on the North Shore of Massachusetts. In 2010 the Good Morning Gloucester blog is now receiving more than 60,000 visitors per month and recorded its one millionth visitor in February, 2010. Since March 2009 the Good Morning Gloucester blog is displayed prominently on the Cape Ann newspaper, The Gloucester Daily Times website front page.

The Good Morning Gloucester float "What Up Homie" won first prize, (uncategorized division), in the 2010 Gloucester Horribles parade on July 3, 2010.

On June 20, 2011 the 29,072 views of Good Morning Gloucester eclipsed the 28,789 population of Gloucester

In May 2015 over 40,000 posts have been published in Good Morning Gloucester.

October 1, 2012, Good Morning Gloucester is now averaging 60,000 unique views per day, twice the population of Cape Ann.

On November 7, 2012 Toby Burnham is awarded the GMG Good Egg of the Year Award for doing what he does every day, being a Good Egg. On Nov 6 Toby grabbed a seagull who had become impaled on a fishing lure and removed the hooks.

In 2014 GMG was viewed over 2.5 million times.

By July 2018, the GMG homepage had been viewed over 5.5 million times. An eclectic mix of posts garnered the most hits from "Jim Dowd responds to the Marathon Bombing" to "The Elephant In The Room- This Chick’s Camel Toe".

== Recurring themes ==
- "What Up Homie?" A frequent sometimes daily post of a photo of a seagull with a cartoon cloud showing what the seagull is thinking. Mostly humorous although Homie sometimes shows the gritty reality of a commercial fishing harbor.
- Early morning photograph of Gloucester. This long-running series shows a Gloucester one rarely sees unless you work on the docks.
- Beautiful Industry. Articles or photos of the fishing industry of Gloucester, MA.
- Art. Article or photos highlighting the high concentration of art and artists on Cape Ann.
- Good Eggs. Articles based around members of the Cape Ann community that have done something above and beyond, usually in a voluntary capacity.
- Food Reviews. Usually a very up close photo of a restaurant meal in Gloucester. Since Gloucester is a working fishing port these reviews tend to be mostly about breakfast since there are at least forty establishments that serve early risers.
- GMG Represents! The posting of photos sent in by GMG fans holding a GMG bumper sticker while visiting a foreign land. From Manchester to Moscow.
- Cape Ann Sports! A cadre of professional GMG photographers roam the playing fields and gyms of Cape Ann schools to get in depth action photography of athletic events in the area.
- Fishermen Tattoos. Photographs of tattoos worn by fishermen and others working in Gloucester Harbor.
- St. Peter's Fiesta. Annual in depth coverage of the fiesta held the weekend closest to the saint's feast day including the blessing of the fleet, and the greasy pole contest.
- The Block Party. In depth coverage of the Gloucester Block Parties held on several Saturdays during the summer.
- Gloucester Zen. Movies usually shot in early morning with a stationary camera at high resolution of waves or birds with audio. Good for meditation.
- WhaZat? A posting of a photograph somewhere on Cape Ann. GMG regulars then try and guess exactly what it is and where. These photos are usually close-ups of some strange anomaly to make guessing difficult. Expensive prizes awarded to the most accurate guess.
- Art Rocks. Artist Paul Frontiero sketches a scene on a beach rock using only a Sharpie. He then posts a clue as to where it is on GMG and the game is on. Some GMG'ers have been racing around in the early morning hours for years trying in vain to own an Art Rock. On the back is Mr. Frontiero's email and he is notified by the new owner that some Art Rocks have made it halfway around the world.
- Gloucester Doors. Photographs of doors of shops in Gloucester usually done in the early morning.
- Rosa Rugosa! The documentation of Joey Ciaramitaro's infatuation with a common thorny invasive species of Cape Ann. Mostly close-up photographs of the abundant flowers of rosa rugosa.
- Bizarre Sea Creatures. Anything really strange brought up in a net or a lobster trap is photographed and posted on GMG. Rare blue or calico lobsters. Lobsters with more than two claws. Lobsters that have just shed their shell and are as soft as jelly. Although most are strange lobsters even the common striped bass is photographed and posted if it is large and especially if it is the first one of the season.
- The Uncategorizable. Photos or videos of fishermen doing strange things. They can be found leaping off buildings into the harbor wearing only a jock strap and a funny hat or French kissing large sea creatures. Incidents like these are recorded by GMG either in photos, movies, or words. Real stories of real people. CGI or photoshopping is not allowed.
- Man vs. Food. First to eat a five-pound burger. First to eat a massive breakfast. Last to cry and run home to mommy after eating very hot chicken wings with 4.7 million scoville units of hot sauce. All of these contests and more are captured at GMG. "I dare you" is usually all it takes to begin a contest and Joey is ready to MC.
- "What did JJ Jinglenuts catch today?" Up close photos of a mouse, chipmunk, mole, etc. conjectured to be the remnants of an interaction with the cat, JJ Jinglenuts. This series ended on June 9, 2010 with the death of Mr Jinglenuts.
- The Lobster Trap Tree. An annual Christmas season event of the stacking of lobster traps into an enormous Christmas Tree. Other towns down the coast now imitate this annual event.

== GMG as Newsbreaker ==
- Monday, March 29, 2011, Ellen "E.J." Lefavour who writes the "Did You Know" series at GMG, (now a book) was interviewed by Fox News for her recent GMG story of the letter delivery to Annisquam that took 66 years.
- Monday, June 28, 2010, GMG was visited by a record 6,329 during a peak of the Fiesta coverage.
- On May 27, 2010, Good Morning Gloucester caught the start of The Amazing Race on video and confirmed that the 17th race begins in Gloucester.
- February 26, 2010, Good Morning Gloucester was viewed for the one millionth time.
- October 20, 2009, GMG interviews fisherman from The Deadliest Catch including Captains Andy and Jonathan Hillstrand of the Time Bandit.
- June 2009 GMG posts exclusive set photos of Adam Sandler movie, Grown Ups.
- May 24, 2009 Exclusive Photos of Salma Hayek shopping for produce at the seasonal Farmer's Market in Gloucester.
- August 2008 GMG starts fund raising to plant flowering trees on a barren traffic island on Eastern Avenue in Gloucester. In less than a month the money is collected and the trees are planted by GMG volunteers.
- April 2008 GMG posts exclusive set photos of Sandra Bullock movie, The Proposal.

== Awards ==
- 2015 Best of Cape Ann Award
- Joey Ciaramitaro; 2015 Gloucester’s Business Person of the Year by the Cape Ann Chamber of Commerce for Good Morning Gloucester
- CBS Boston Most Valuable Boston Blogger Award
- 2013 BONS (Best of North Shore) Magazine Awards For Best Blog Editors Choice and Best Blog Readers Choice
- 2012 BONS (Best of North Shore) Magazine Awards For Best Blog Editors Choice and Best Blog Readers Choice
- CBS Boston, 2011 Most Valuable Blog Award
- Action Inc.'s 2009 Community Outreach Award conferred at the Action Inc. Annual Meeting, Gloucester, MA, September 23, 2009
- United States Congress Certificate of Special Recognition Award from Congressman John F. Tierney, 6th District of Massachusetts.
- Commonwealth of Massachusetts State Senate Special Recognition Award offered by State Senator Bruce E. Tarr
- Commonwealth of Massachusetts House of Representatives Special Recognition Award offered by State Representative Ann-Margaret Ferrante
