= United Nations Satellite Centre =

United Nations Satellite Centre

- Abbreviation: UNOSAT
- Formation: 2001
- Type: United Nations Programme
- Legal status: Active
- Headquarters: Geneva, Switzerland
- Head: Einar Bjørgo
- Website: www.unosat.org

The United Nations Satellite Centre (UNOSAT) is a center under the United Nations Institute for Training and Research. It is headquartered in Geneva, Switzerland.

The center carries the mission to promote evidence-based decision making for peace, security and resilience using geo-spatial information technologies. UNOSAT provides the United Nations funds, programmes and specialized agencies with satellite analysis, training and capacity development, at their request. UNOSAT also supports the UN Member States with satellite imagery analysis over their respective territories and provides them with training and capacity development in the use of geospatial information technologies.

== Mandate ==
UNOSAT is mandated to provide United Nations funds, programmes and specialized agencies with satellite analysis, training and capacity development, at their request, as well as to continue supporting Member States with satellite imagery analysis over their respective territories and to provide training and capacity development in the use of geospatial information technologies.

== History ==
UNOSAT was launched in 2001 as a project funded by the United Nations Office for Project Services (UNOPS). Hosted at CERN since 2002, UNOSAT expanded its activities and the Humanitarian Rapid Mapping service was established in 2003. That same year, UNOSAT starts a partnership with the International Charter Space and Major Disasters and becomes the United Nations focal point.

UNOSAT joined UNITAR in 2009, becoming a programme unit. The same year, the rapid mapping service extends its operations to human rights contexts.

In 2014 and 2015, the offices in Nairobi, Kenya and Bangkok, Thailand are opened, both with a regional focus.

In June 2021, following the recommendation of the Secretary-General of the United Nations, the United Nations Economic and Social Council (ECOSOC) passes a resolution recognizing UNOSAT as the United Nations Satellite Center.

Since the start of the Russian invasion of Ukraine in February 2022, UNOSAT has been analyzing damage using satellite imagery, for example for UNESCO, in order to assess the impact on cultural sites.

== Funding ==
UNOSAT is a programme of UNITAR and therefore all funding goes through the Institute. UNITAR is a project-based organization and does not receive any funds from the regular United Nations budget. The institute is financed entirely from voluntary contributions mainly from UN Member States, other UN agencies, international and Intergovernmental organization, NGOs and the private sector.

== Offices ==
UNOSAT’s main office is hosted at the UNITAR headquarters, in Geneva (Switzerland) and benefits from an office at CERN through its historic partnership. UNOSAT is also represented in UNITAR regional offices in New York City (US), in Bangkok (Thailand), and Nairobi (Kenya). UNOSAT also manages project related offices in the Pacific: in Fiji, Vanuatu and the Solomon Islands.

== See also ==
- UNITAR
- CERN
- United Nations
