= Development trust =

Development trusts are organisations operating in the United Kingdom that are:

- community based, owned and led
- engaged in the economic, environmental and social regeneration of a defined area or community
- independent but seek to work in partnership with other private, voluntary, and public sector organisations
- self-sufficient or aiming for self-sufficiency, and not for private profit.

There is no set form of legal structure, and a development trust may be registered as a company limited by guarantee, a community interest company, or an industrial and provident society. Many register as charities.

The activities undertaken by development trusts are various and include:

- running the local shop and post office
- developing play park and recreational facilities
- managing a housing development
- developing renewable energy projects such as wind farms
- setting up training programmes.

They are informed by a belief that community regeneration that is achieved through community-owned enterprise is the way to build strong and sustainable communities.

There are over 500 development trusts throughout the UK. The Development Trusts Association (DTA) was formed in 1993 to coordinate them in England. The mission of the DTA was “to bring about a successful development trust in every community that wants one”.

In January 2011 the DTA announced that they were merging with the British Association of Settlements and Social Action Centres and that a new joint organisation for England would be called Locality.

A new organisation for Northern Ireland was also established, joining the existing sister organisations in Wales and Development Trusts Association Scotland.
