= Global Migration Group =

Global UN-led forum on migration issues

The Global Migration Group (GMG) is a group consisting of fourteen UN agencies, the World Bank and the International Organization for Migration that work to address global migration issues.

GMG was created in 2006 by then UN Secretary-General Kofi Annan to better coordinate multilateral migration governance initiatives. The Group's primary aim is to improve the management of cross-border migration, to promote further research and to develop international norms relating to migration.

== GMG organization ==
GMG is chaired on a six-month rotating basis by a member agency. For each six-month term, GMG adopts a thematic topic to guide its activities. For example, UNICEF chaired the Group during the first half of 2011 and focused on youth. UNESCO Chaired GMG during the second half of the year and focused on climate change impacts on migration.

The GMG also coordinates its activities with the Global Forum on Migration and Development, although the two organizations are not formally affiliated.

== GMG working themes for 2011 ==
=== Climate change and global migration theme (July – December 2011) ===
During UNESCO's 2011 chairmanship, GMG focused on linkages between the environment, human settlement and population movement.

GMG is working identify the challenges inherent in the links between climate change and migration, displacement and relocation. Such challenges include the legal and normative framework applicable to environmentally induced displacement and migration. There remains a lack of clarity on issues such as the legal status of people fleeing environmental disasters, the need for better data collection and monitoring, and the consideration of migration as a de facto adaptation strategy in national climate change strategies, for example in National Adaptation Plans of Action (NAPAs).

=== Youth and global migration theme (January – June 2011) ===
During UNICEF's 2011 chairmanship, GMG focused on bringing greater attention to a rights based approach to adolescent and youth issues within the discussion on international migration. These issues are considered from an equity, human development and gender perspective.

The GMG focuses on the medium and long-term impacts of migration on youth and adolescents. Young people are more likely to take on the risks of international migration in pursuit of its expected gains, including education. Greater equality of opportunity in communities of origin, transit and destination can ensure the wellbeing of young migrants and maximise their contributions as workers, entrepreneurs, students and members of society. Exploring issues such as looking into how best to address inequality of opportunities for adolescents and youth in countries of origin may reduce migration by necessity.

Special attention is paid to identifying common policy and programmatic approaches for enhancing cooperation among governments, agencies and relevant stakeholders. This effort aims to increase policy coherence and develop the capacity of stakeholders in data collection, analysis, evidence-based policymaking, and dissemination of best practices at country, regional and global levels.

== See also ==
- Global Forum on Migration and Development
- KNOMAD
