= United Nations Institute for Training and Research =

Teaching institute of the United Nations

- Abbreviation: UNITAR
- Formation: 11 December 1963; 62 years ago
- Type: Research and training institute
- Legal status: Active
- Headquarters: Geneva, Switzerland
- Head: Executive Director; Michelle Gyles-McDonnough
- Parent organization: United Nations General Assembly; United Nations Economic and Social Council
- Website: www.unitar.org

The United Nations Institute for Training and Research (UNITAR) is a dedicated training arm of the United Nations system. UNITAR provides training and capacity development activities to assist mainly developing countries with special attention to Least Developed Countries (LDCs), Small Island Developing States (SIDS) and other groups and communities who are most vulnerable, including those in conflict situations.

== Facts ==
- Established in 1963
- Over 577,000 beneficiaries per year
- More than 1,400 training and research related activities per year
- Headquarters in Geneva (Switzerland) with a representation office in New York City (US), project offices in Hiroshima (Japan), and Bonn (Germany).
- 30 associated training centers (CIFAL)
- About 400 staff and collaborators

== History ==
The idea of a United Nations training and research institute was mentioned for the first time in a 1962 resolution of the UN General Assembly. UNITAR was founded in 1963, following the recommendation of the UN Economic and Social Council to the General Assembly, which commissioned the UN Secretary-General with the establishment of a United Nations Institute for Training and Research as an autonomous body within the UN system.

The creation of UNITAR coincided with the addition of 36 States since 1960, including 28 African States to the United Nations. That unprecedented wave of decolonization created a critical need for assistance, as many of the newly independent States lacked the capacity to train their young diplomats. Shaped by its first four Executive Directors originally from the newly independent African States, the Institute's vision of training was developed considering the very needs and priorities of recipient countries.

UNITAR commenced functioning in March 1965. The Institute originally had its headquarters based in New York City. In 1993, UNITAR's headquarters were transferred to Geneva (Switzerland).

On the 3rd of September 2026 the General Assembly passed a resolution for the merger of the United Nations System Staff College (UNSSC) into UNITAR by the 1st January 2027. Following this merger UNITAR will also be renamed to the United Nations Institute for Capability and Learning Innovation (UNICLI).

== UNITAR today ==
Multiculturalism

The Institute provides training and learning services to national and local government officials of UN member states and civil society representatives from around the world. UNITAR strives to respond to the growing demand from UN member States, especially the Least Developed Countries, for capacity development in the thematic areas of the 2030 Agenda for Sustainable Development.

UNITAR helps governments to understand climate change, chemicals and waste management, and green economy. The institute also assists ministries of finance through its courses on public debt management, finance and trade, and it provides government officials with training in Peacekeeping and conflict prevention. Through the United Nations Satellite Centre (UNOSAT), the Institute supports United Nations funds, programmes, specialized agencies and Member States with satellite imagery analysis over their respective territories, and provide training and capacity development in the use of geospatial information technologies.

Since 2003, UNITAR provides courses to support municipal and regional leaders dealing with complex public policies.

Another task of the institute is to organize knowledge sharing events for the UN Secretary-General, including the annual seminar for Special Representatives of the UN Secretary-General as well as strategic meetings for UN Departments. UNITAR also spearheads UN inter-agency initiatives such as the one UN Learning Platform on Climate Change or the Global Migration Group.

UNITAR's research activities are focusing on knowledge systems and their practical applications. They support the Institute's training activities through the provision of learning environments adapted to respond to the needs of adult learners, thus facilitating the increase, efficiency and outreach of the Institute's capacity development activities.

== Governance ==
UN General Assembly 20-11-2009

Operated as an autonomous body within the United Nations system, UNITAR is headed by an Executive Director and governed by a board of trustees. The Executive Director and the members of the board of trustees are appointed by the United Nations Secretary-General.

UNITAR Executive Directors:

Michelle Gyles-McDonnough	Jamaica	2025–present
Nikhil Seth	India	2015–2025
Sally Fegan-Wyles	Ireland	2012–2015
Carlos Lopes	Guinea-Bissau	2007–2012
Marcel André Boisard	Switzerland	1992–2007
Michel Doo-Kingué	Cameroon	1983–1992
Davidson Nicol	Sierra Leone	1972–1982
S.O. Adebo	Nigeria	1969–1972
Gabriel d’Arboussier	Senegal	1965–1967

== Funding ==
Training and learning

UNITAR is a project-based organization and does not receive any funds from the regular United Nations budget. The institute is financed entirely from voluntary contributions mainly from UN Member States, other UN agencies, international and Intergovernmental organization, NGOs and the private sector.

== Offices ==
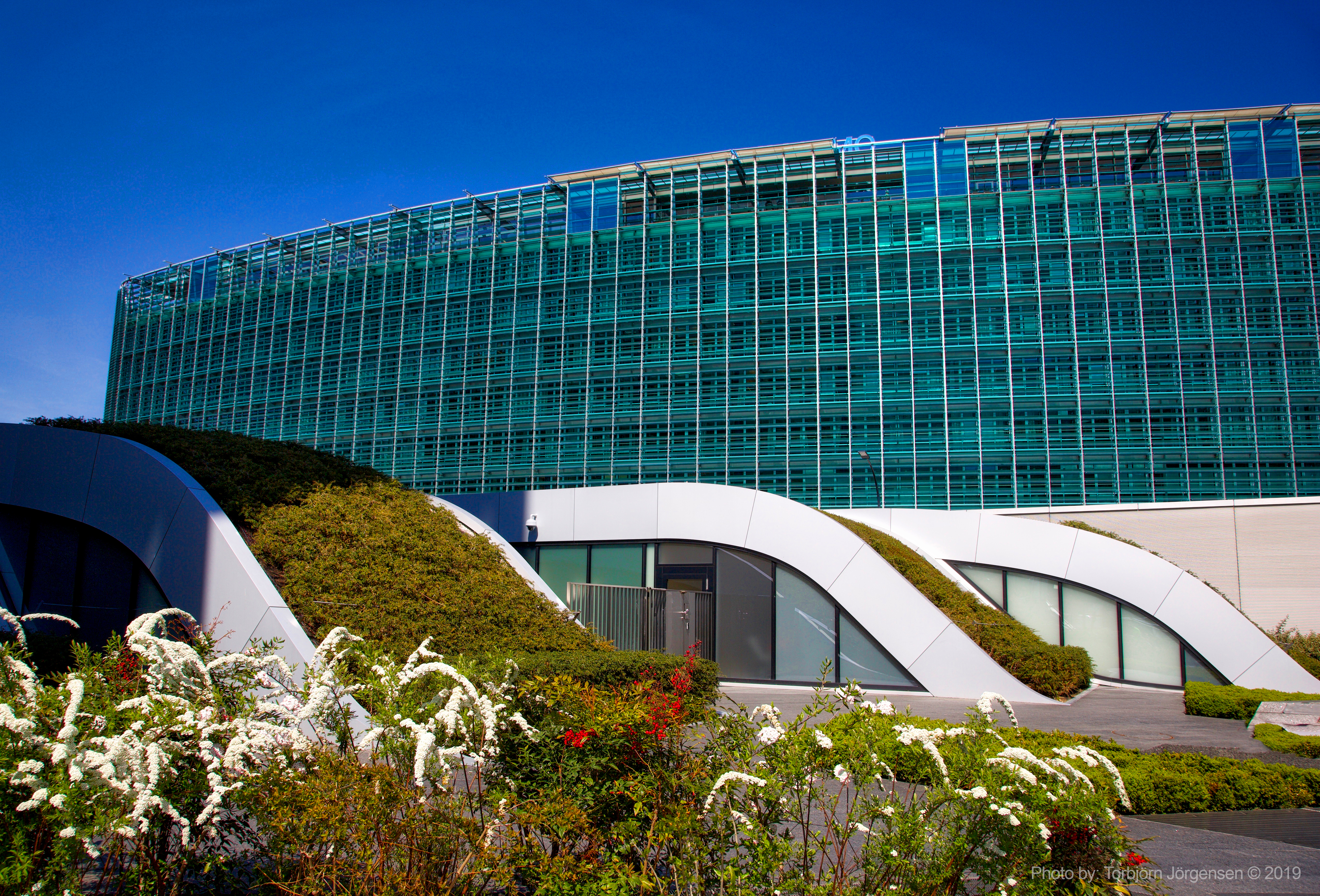
Headquarters in Geneva, Switzerland

Headquarters are based in Geneva (Switzerland), complemented with a representation office in New York City (US), and project offices in Hiroshima (Japan) and Bonn (Germany).

UNITAR also delivers training through its CIFAL Global Network (Centre International de Formation des Autorités et Leaders) composed of 30 international, associated training centers. These CIFAL centers are located across Asia, Africa, Australia, Europe, the Americas and the Caribbean.

== Areas of Work ==
UNITAR has training expertise in multilateral diplomacy, conflict prevention and peacemaking, peacekeeping, adaptation to climate change, green economy, chemicals and waste management, local governance, as well as public finance and trade, and supporting coherence for the 2030 Agenda amongst others. UNITAR also serves as a research centre for application of satellite imagery to humanitarian, conflict or disaster situations, through UNOSAT, the United Nations Satellite Centre.

The work of the institute is organized under five pillars:

- Promote peace and just and inclusive societies (Peace)
- Prosperity through sustainable economic growth (Prosperity)
- People and social inclusion (People)
- Planet, environmental protection and restoration, and climate change (Planet)
- Optimizing the use of technology and supporting coherence for the 2030 Agenda (Cross-fertilizing knowledge and expertise)

== See also ==
- United Nations University
- United Nations System Staff College
