= The Marriage of Sense and Soul =

1998 book by Ken Wilber

The Marriage of Sense and Soul: Integrating Science and Religion
- Cover showing the author
- Author: Ken Wilber
- Language: English
- Subject: Relationship between religion and science
- Publisher: Broadway Books
- Publication date: 1998
- Publication place: United States
- Media type: Print (Paperback)
- Pages: 240
- ISBN: 978-0767903431

The Marriage of Sense and Soul: Integrating Science and Religion is a 1998 book by American writer Ken Wilber, which addresses the relationship between religion and science. The book reasons as follows: by adopting contemplative disciplines (such as meditation) related to Spirit and integrating them within a context of broad science, "the spiritual, subjective world of ancient wisdom" could be joined "with the objective, empirical world of modern knowledge". In this context, Wilber views Spirit as transcendent or contemplative consciousness, or the spiritual ground of being. The text further contends that such integration of science and religion would inherently have political aspects.

== Significance ==
Underscoring the importance of the relationship between religion and science for the evolving world, Wilber explains that science "has given us the methods for discovering truth, while religion is the force that generates meaning". To illustrate this point, the author uses his "All Quadrants All Levels" (AQAL) model to show how varied understandings of Spirit—including romanticism, idealism, and postmodernism—have historically informed humanity's own development in relation to his "Big Three" cultural "value spheres":

- art (upper-left quadrant of the model)
- morals (lower-left quadrant of the model)
- science (right column of the model).

== Summary ==
=== Part I: The Problem ===
The psychologist Roger Walsh, in his review of The Marriage of Sense and Soul, points out that despite significant differences among religions, there is broad consensus among scholars that the great chain of being (a Medieval Christian hierarchy of living beings) is central to nearly all major religions. Walsh also notes that this hierarchy was once humanity's dominant worldview, but with the advent of modernity, the West became the first civilization to abandon it.

Wilber uses the term Great Nest of Being to describe his concept of a holarchy, visualized as concentric spheres or circles. In this model, each level of existence, or "senior dimension," encompasses and transcends the previous level, which he refers to as its "junior". This hierarchy progresses from matter through mind to Spirit.

Wilber identifies a three-level scheme within this holarchy, which he argues is reflected in various cultural and spiritual traditions. He cites the example of "earth, human, and heaven" as a scheme found in shamanic traditions; he also cites the Hindu and Buddhist concept of the "three great states of being"—the gross (matter and body), the subtle (mind and soul), and the causal (spirit).

Furthermore, Wilber argues that many religions, particularly those of antiquity and the classical period, traditionally viewed science as one valid way among others to acquire knowledge, alongside approaches such theology and mysticism. This viewpoint, which Wilber identifies as epistemological pluralism, acknowledged that each method had its proper place in the great chain of being. He highlights Christian mystics such as St. Bonaventure and Hugh of St. Victor as proponents of this perspective, pointing to their belief in the "eye of flesh" (sensory perception), the "eye of mind" (reason), and the "eye of contemplation" (mystical insight) as evidence of their acceptance of multiple routes to knowledge.

For this triple vision, man was endowed with a triple eye, as explained by Hugh of St. Victor: the eye of flesh, of reason, and of contemplation; the eye of flesh, to see the world and what it contains; the eye of reason, to see the soul and what it contains; the eye of contemplation, to see God and that which is within Him. Through the eye of the flesh, man was to see the things outside him; with the eye of reason, the things within him; with the eye of contemplation, the things above him.

— St. Bonaventure, The Breviloquium, Part II, Chapter 12, No. 5

As Wilber notes, however, prioritizing the "eyes of mind and flesh" obscures the "eye of contemplation." He clarifies that the "eye of flesh" is monological; the "eye of mind" is dialogical; and the "eye of contemplation" is translogical.

Similarly, along with the Enlightenment, an entire set of values gradually emerged, including the following: "equality, freedom, and justice; representational and deliberative democracy, the equality of all citizens before the law, regardless of race, sex, or creed; political and civil rights (freedom of speech, religion, assembly, fair trial, etc.)". As a result, and because they'd "existed nowhere" on a large scale in "the premodern world", Wilber refers to these values and rights "as the dignity of modernity" [emphasis in original]. Subsequently, but pointing to the work of sociologist Max Weber and philosopher Jürgen Habermas, the book further contends that modernity is chiefly defined by its "differentiation of the cultural value spheres" or "the Big Three": "art, morals, and science; the Beautiful, the Good, and the True". These spheres can be seen in Wilber's AQAL model (as described in the "Significance" section above). Nevertheless, where this modern differentiation can be said to have begun "in earnest around the sixteenth and seventeenth centuries", "by the end of the eighteenth century and the beginning of the nineteenth, the differentiation was already drifting into a painful and pathological dissociation". Consequently, in this way, the left-hand or interior dimensions of the AQAL model were ultimately "reduced to their Right-Hand or exterior correlates which utterly collapsed the Great Chain of Being, and with it, the core claims of the great wisdom traditions".

=== Part II: Previous Attempts at Integration ===
The German philosopher Immanuel Kant

Acknowledging that philosopher Immanuel Kant recognized this "leveling and deadening of the modern monological collapse" however, Wilber chronicles the philosopher's subsequent attempt to integrate "moral we-wisdom with scientific it-knowledge". From this vantage point, Kant's book Critique of Pure Reason is described as an affirmation that "science alone gives cognitive knowledge, 'real' knowledge, and all else is nonsensical metaphysics." His second critique, Critique of Practical Reason, similarly explored humanity's moral dimensions in concluding that while "(m)en and women are not free as empirical objects—in the world of ITS . . . as ethical subjects, men and women are indeed autonomous" [emphasis in original]. Further pursuing this line of thought, but using the moral rationale of "ought", Kant's third critique, Critique of Judgement, begins by examining the realm of aesthetics along the way to ascertaining, as Wilber paraphrases it, "that the interior 'ought' of moral reasoning could never get going in the first place without the postulates of a transcendental Spirit".

Consequently, in the aftermath of Kant's contributions, the members of the Romantic movement "began an intense effort to make the I-domain, the subjective domain—and especially the domain of aesthetics, sentiment, emotion, heroic self-expression, and feeling—the royal road to Spirit and the Absolute". However, because "romanticism was a philosophical revolt against rationalism" the movement "fell violent prey to" what Wilber has termed, "the pre/trans fallacy [emphasis in original], namely, the confusion of prerational with transrational simply because both are nonrational".

Similarly, there was also ambiguity "between premodern and modern cultures" as to "the direction in which the universe" was said to be unfolding. Where a "time of creation" as recounted amongst premodern religions often entailed "a Great Spirit of one sort or another" creating "the world out of itself, or out of some prima materia", these traditions also commonly point to "a series of strange events" in which it was told that "either God began slowly to withdraw from humans, or humans withdrew from this God"—in any case, generally depicting scenarios in which mankind inevitably "lost touch with the primal Eden". During the modern era however, this "idea of history as devolution (or a fall from God) was slowly replaced by the idea of history as evolution (or a growth toward God)". Thus, where history for premodern cultures was merely devolution, "one of the great announcements of the Idealists" asserted that "cosmic and human history" instead, was "most profoundly the evolution and development of Spirit".

Beginning then with Kant's assertion "that we can never know 'the thing in itself', only the appearance or phenomenon that results when the thing in itself is acted on by the categories of the human mind", German Idealism shared much of its inception with "the notion that the world is not merely perceived but constructed". [emphasis in original] For them, "(n)ot naive empiricism, but mental idealism," was of essence in one's "perception of the world". Thus, and to his credit, Johann Fichte is particularly notable in reasoning that "if you cannot know anything at all about the thing in itself", then ultimately self-consciousness too is a social phenomena.

Everything that from eternity has happened in heaven and earth, the life of God and all the deeds of time simply are the struggles for Mind to know itself, to make itself objective to itself, to find itself, be for itself, and finally unite itself to itself; it is alienated and divided, but only so as to be able thus to find itself and return to itself.

— G.W.F. Hegel, Hegel's Lectures on the History of Philosophy, "Introduction – The Notion of the History of Philosophy"

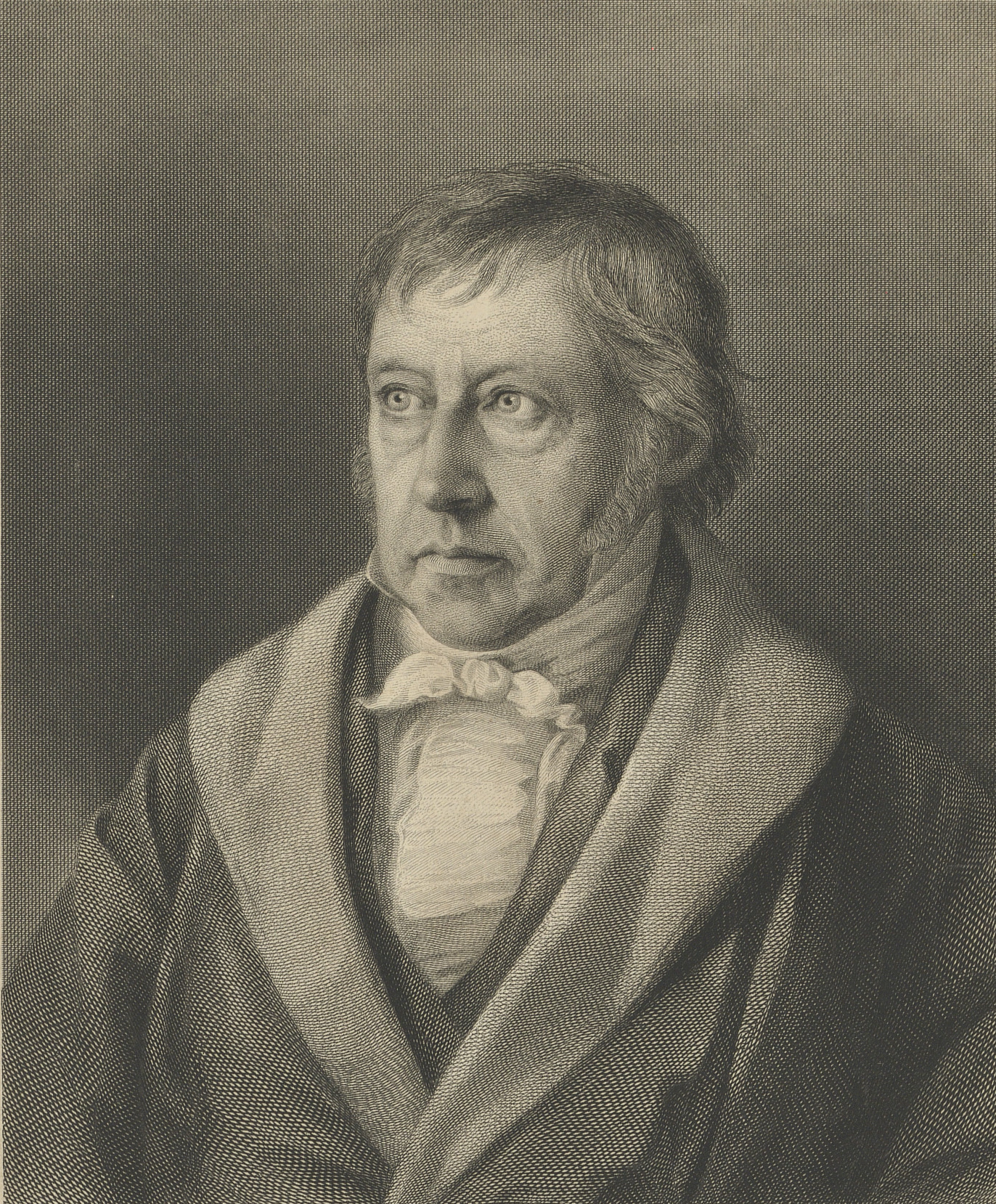
The German philosopher Georg Wilhelm Friedrich Hegel

Consequently, in sublimating the preceding lines of thought, Wilber outlines three principal features of spiritual evolution:

1. Involution: This original "descent" of Spirit" is a forgetting, a fall, a self-alienation of Spirit".
2. Evolution: In this "second major stage of development, Spirit evolves from objective Nature to subjective Mind".
3. Nondual Spirit: Spirit comes to know "itself objectively as Nature; knows itself subjectively as Mind; and knows itself absolutely as Spirit—the Source, the Summit, the Ground and the Process of the entire ordeal".

Building on this outline, Wilber subsequently notes that "for both Schelling and Hegel, Spirit goes out of itself to produce objective Nature, awakens to itself in subjective Mind, then recovers itself in pure nondual Spirit, where subject and object are one pure act of nondual consciousness that unifies both Nature and Mind in realized Spirit". Unfortunately, yet underscoring Idealism's remarkable percipience in discerning "the integration of empirical evolution with transcendental Spirit" as reflecting "Spirit-in-action", "it possessed no yoga—that is, no tried and tested practice for reliably reproducing the transpersonal and superconscious insights that formed the very core of the great Idealist vision". Furthermore, and "because the Idealists lacked a genuine spiritual injunction (practice, exemplar, paradigm), they were indeed, at least in this respect, caught in 'mere metaphysics'". Consequently then, and "lacking the means of consistently delivering direct spiritual experience—Idealism in this regard degenerated into abstract speculations without the means of experiential confirmation or rejection" [emphasis in original]. Simply because "every holon has a Left- and a Right-Hand dimension, and therefore every holon without exception has an objective (Right) and an interpretive (Left) component", postmodernism would ultimately assume "the great and nobel" aim of introducing "interpretation as an intrinsic aspect of the Kosmos" [emphasis in original].

Yet, and for "postmodernism, this moment of truth—every actual occasion has an interpretive component—was taken to absurd and self-defeating extremes", leading to a facile reasoning that since "(t)here is nothing but interpretation", dispensing "with the objective component of truth" at times merely serves as practical convenience. Disconcertingly though, "(t)his extreme denial of any sort of objective truth" has subsequently amounted "to a denial of the Right-Hand quadrants altogether, precisely the reverse disaster of modernity" [emphasis in original].

If we are to integrate the wisdom of yesterday with the knowledge of today—and that means, in the broadest sweep, the best of premodern, modern, and postmodern—we will have to look carefully at what the postmodern linguistic turn brought to our understanding of the Kosmos.

— Ken Wilber, The Marriage of Sense and Soul

For this reason, perhaps, Wilber cites the relevance of three core assumptions that underlie postmodern expression in the form(s) of constructivism, contextualism, and integral-aperspectival as all coming "to the fore with the linguistic turn". Similarly, while crediting Jean Gebser for coining the term 'integral-aperspectival', Wilber further elucidates the word's meaning as a "pluralistic or multiple-perspectives view" privileging "no single perspective", but which in turn, affords "a more holistic or integral" vantage point. Employing the same term somewhat interchangeably with "vision-logic or network-logic" [emphasis in original], Wilber recognizes the linguist and philosopher Ferdinand de Saussure for taking vision-logic and applying "it to language, thus disclosing, for the first time in history, its network structure." Likewise, Wilber further asserts "(t)he linguistic turn is, at bottom, vision-logic looking at language itself".

Nonetheless, but "(s)tarting from the admirable reliance on vision-logic and integral-aperspectival awareness—yet still unable to escape the collapse of the Kosmos—these postmodern movements ended up subtly embodying and even extending the reductionistic nightmare". To provide an example of this statement, Wilber refers to William H. Gass's novel The Tunnel as an eptiome what many people claim "to be the ultimate postmodern novel"; Wilber concurs with the scholar RobertAlter's that the novel's defining strategy is reflected in how "everything is deliberately reduced to the flattest surface." Thus Gass's text is said to accomplish this by "denying the possibility of making consequential distinctions between, or meaningful ranking of, moral or aesthetic values. There is no within: murderer and victim, lover and onanist, altruist and bigot, dissolve into the same ineluctable slime". Wilber subsequently concludes that "under the intense gravity of flatland, integral-aperspectival awareness became simply aperspectival madness—the contradictory belief that no belief is better than any other—a total paralysis of thought, will, and action in the face of a million perspectives all given exactly the same depth, namely, zero".

=== Part III: A Reconciliation ===
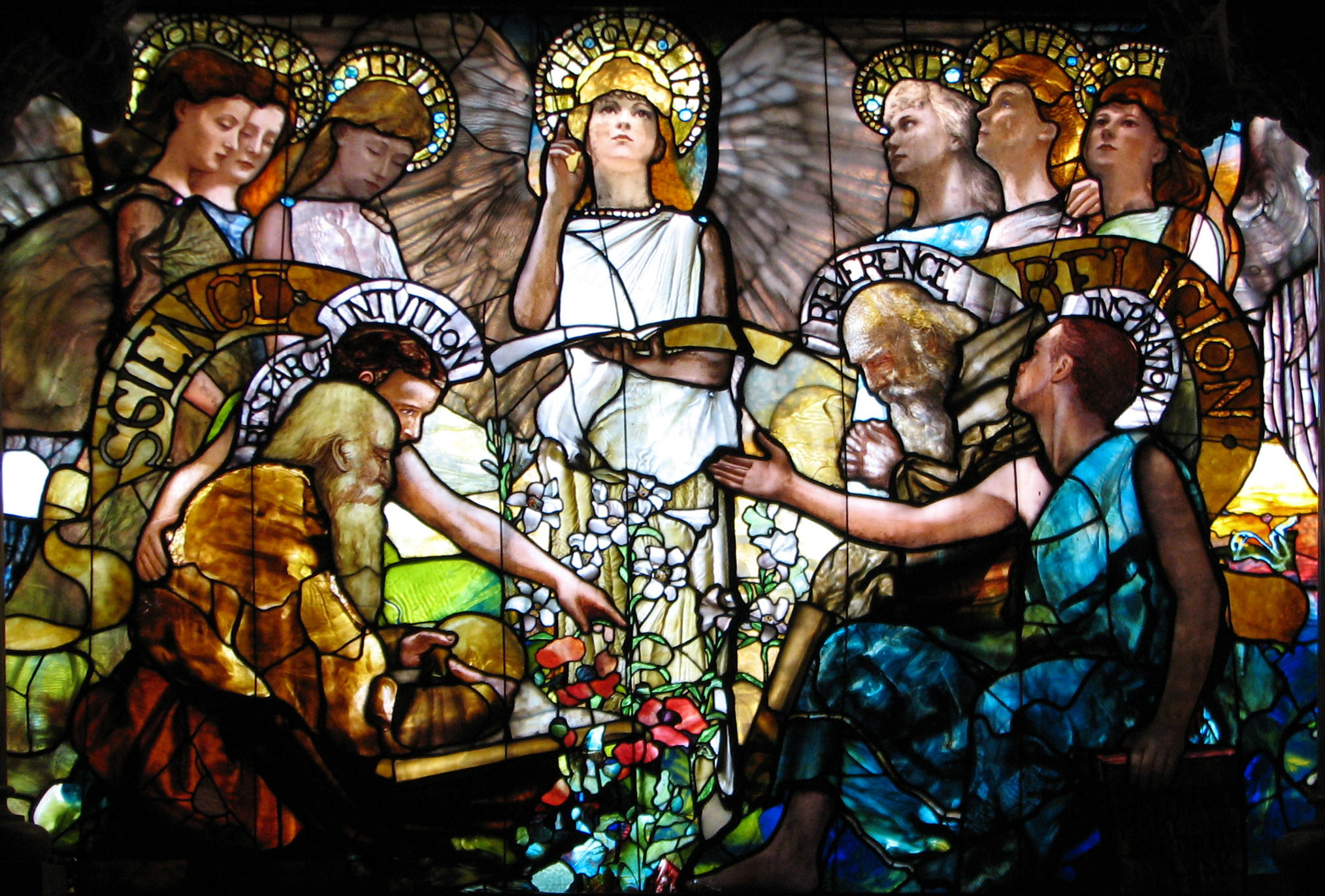
Science and religion are portrayed as harmonious in the stained-glass window Education (1890) by Louis Comfort Tiffany.

Consequently, and because "(a) modern and postmodern spirituality has continued to elude us," Wilber proposes his vision for a spirituality capable of standing "up to scientific authority . . . by announcing its own means and modes, data and evidence, validates and verifications". Along these same lines, the author subsequently outlines what he regards as empirical science's two primary objections to an integration of science and religion:

1. "[T]here are no irreducible interior domains that can be studied by different modes of knowing, there are only objective ITS (atomistic or holistic) studied best by science. In short, interior domains have no reality of their own; thus there are no 'interior' modes of knowing that cannot be explained away, literally."
2. "Even if there were other modes of knowing than the sensory-empirical, they would have no mean of validation and thus could not be taken seriously."

In addressing the first objection, Wilber reasons that if "empirical science rejects the validity of any and all forms of interior apprehension and knowledge, then it" must also reject "its own validity as well". This follows because "a great deal" of this knowledge itself, already "rests on interior structures and apprehensions that are not delivered by" and hence can't be confirmed by, "the senses (such as logic and mathematics, to name only two)." Likewise, "(i)f science acknowledges these interior apprehensions, upon which its own operations depend, then it cannot object to interior knowledge per se. It cannot toss all interiors into the garbage can without tossing itself with it."

Similarly, Wilber asserts that "(o)bjection number 2 can be answered by showing that the scientific method, in general consists of three basic strands of knowing (injunction, apprehension, confirmation/rejection). If it can be shown that the genuine interior modes of knowing also follow these same three strands, then objection number 2 . . . would be substantially refuted" [emphasis in original]. In this way, and "(w)ith the two major scientific objections to the interior domains undone", "a genuine reconciliation of science and religion (and the Big Three in general)" is afforded practical viability.

For these reasons, Wilber subsequently deduces that "sensory empiricism" cannot be included as one of "the defining characteristics of the scientific method", arguing that the "defining patterns of scientific knowledge" instead, "must be able to embrace both biology and mathematics, both geology and anthropology, both physics and logic—some of which are sensory-empirical, some of which are not." In this regard however, he notes "there is sensory empiricism (of the sensorimotor world)" or empiricism in the narrow sense, "mental empiricism (including logic, mathematics, semiotics, phenomenology, and hermeneutics), and spiritual empiricism (experiential mysticism, spiritual experiences)" or empiricism in the broad sense. "In other words, there is evidence seen by the eye of flesh (e.g., intrinsic features of the sensorimotor world), evidence seen by the eye of mind (e.g., mathematics and logic and symbolic interpretations), and evidence seen by the eye of contemplation (e.g., satori, nirvikalpa samadhi, gnosis)" [emphasis in original].

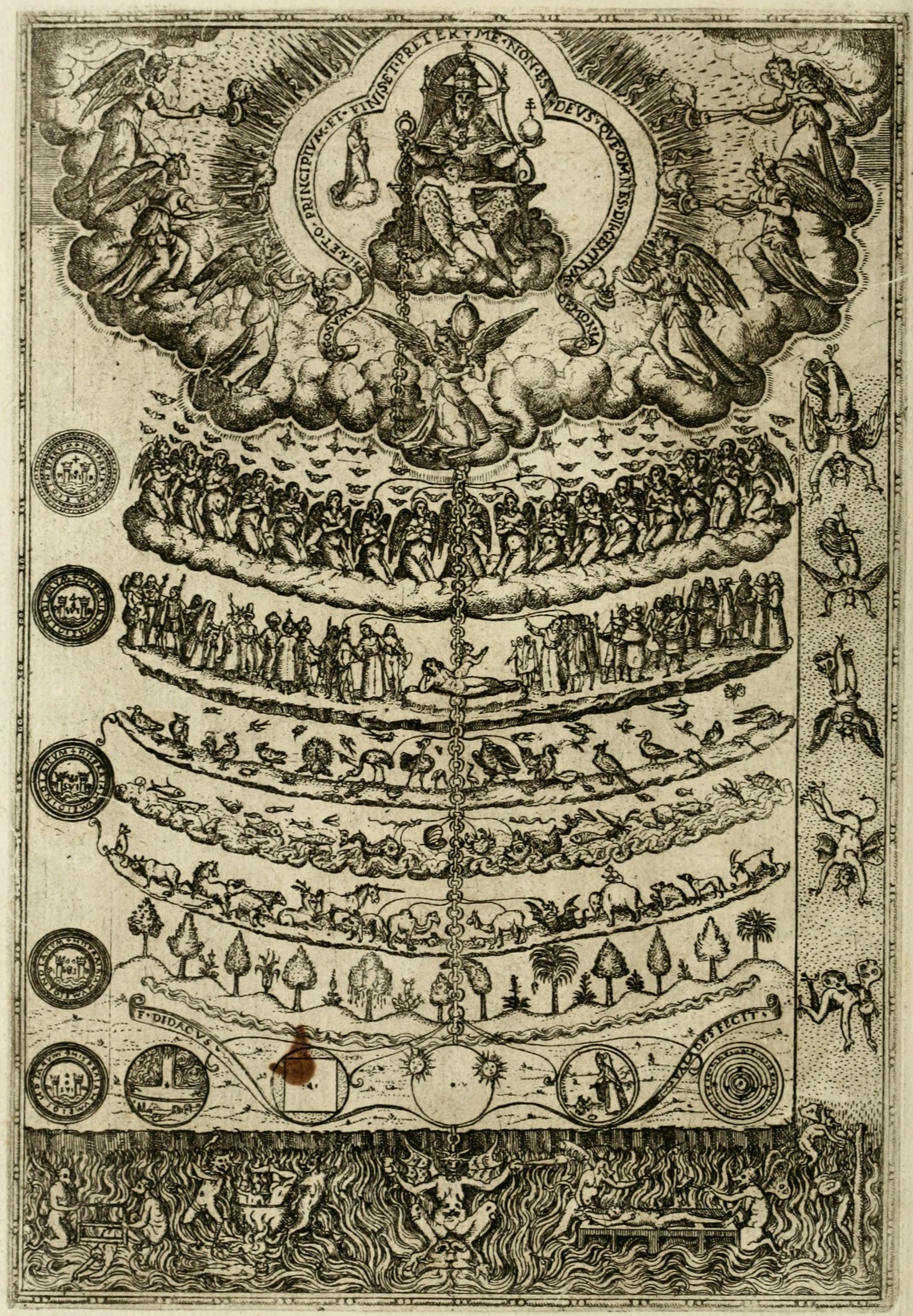
Drawing of the Great chain of being from the book Rhetorica Christiana (1579) by Didacus Valadés

Wilber then outlines what what he believes "are three of the essential aspects of scientific inquiry"; referring to them as the "three strands of all valid knowing":

1. Instrumental injunction: "This is an actual practice, an exemplar, a paradigm, an experiment, an ordinance. It is always of the form "If you want to know this, do this."
2. Direct apprehension: "This is an immediate experience of the domain brought forth by the injunction; that is, a direct experience or apprehension of data (even if the data is mediated, at the moment of experience it is immediately apprehended)."
3. Communal confirmation (or rejection): "This is a checking of the results—the data, the evidence—with others who have adequately completed the injunctive and apprehensive strands".

Advocating that science "expand from narrow empiricism (sensory experience only) to broad empiricism (direct experience in general), Wilber similarly reasons that religion too "must open its truth claims to direct verification—or rejection—by experiential evidence." He subsequently asserts that "(r)eligion, like science, will have to engage the three strands of all valid knowledge and anchor its claims in direct experience".

Authentic spirituality, then, can no longer be mythic, imaginal, mythological, or mythopoetic: it must be based on falsifiable evidence. In other words, it must be, at its core, a series of direct mystical, transcendental, meditative, contemplative, or yogic experiences—not sensory and not mental [emphasis in original], but transsensual, transmental, transpersonal, transcendental consciousness—data seen not merely with the eye of flesh or with the eye of mind, but with the eye of contemplation [emphasis added].

— Ken Wilber, The Marriage of Sense and Soul

Likewise, Wilber contends that "in the modern and postmodern world", religion "will rest on its unique strength—namely, contemplation" or serve to merely "support a premodern, predifferentiated level of development in its own adherents: not (as) an engine of growth and transformation, but (as) a regressive, antiliberal, reactionary force of lesser engagements". He subsequently observes that "(i)f religion possesses something that is uniquely its own, it is contemplation" [emphasis in original]. Moreover, though, "it is the eye of contemplation adequately employed, that follows all three strands of valid knowing". "Thus religion's great, enduring, and unique strength is that, at its core, it is a science of spiritual experience (using "science" in the broad sense as direct experience, in any domain, that submits to the three strands of injunction, data, and falsifiability)" [emphasis in original].

Similarly, "namely, to find some scheme that could accommodate both premodern and modern worldviews, and thus integrate religion and science"—because "the core of premodern religion was the Great Chain, and since the essence of modernity was the differentiation of the value spheres (the Big Three or the four quadrants)"—Wilber's text claims to accomplish a reintegration of religion and science by conjoining "the Great Chain with the four quadrants" [emphasis in original].

=== Part IV: The Path Ahead ===
Adding a clarification for the reconciliation discussed above, Wilber notes that "(w)hat needs to be integrated is not the dissociations but the differentiations of modernity, for not only do these define the dignity of modernity, they are an irreversible part of the evolutionary process of differentiation-and-integration" [emphasis in original]. Also, by virtue of the likelihood that this "future evolution" proves to be a "process of collectively unfolding the yet higher stages of the Great Chain, as it has already unfolded the lower", Wilber envisions too that "real religion—genuine spirituality and the deep sciences of the interior" could subsequently serve "an unprecedented role as the vanguard of evolution, the growing tip of the universal organism, growing toward its own highest potentials, namely, the ever-unfolding realization and actualization of Spirit".

For this reason, and because "(t)raditional conservatism is "in many ways" adduced as being "anchored in premodern worldviews . . . whereas liberalism is largely anchored in the rational differentiations of modernity", Wilber envisages an integration of religion and science as opening "up the possibility of a significant reconciliation of conservative and liberal views". Prospects for this harmonization are further expressed as the means by which transrational awareness, "standing within the political freedom—the liberal freedom—offered by the Enlightenment . . . moves into its own higher estate by pursuing Spiritual Enlightenment, which it then offers, within that same political freedom, to any and all who desire to be released from the chains of space and time, self and suffering, hope and fear, death and wonder" [emphasis in original]. This "politics of meaning" then, in "its own spiritual realization" is "thoroughly transliberal, bringing together the Enlightenment of the East with the Enlightenment of the West".

== Criticism ==
Reflecting a variety of passionate thought concerning a demarcation problem in the relationship between religion and science, The Marriage of Sense and Soul has spawned a range of intellectual response, both positive and negative. Kirkus Reviews magazine, for example, wrote that the book was "Yet another unsuccessful attempt to integrate all of science and all of religion in one Grand Unified Theory. . . . This fusion of science and religion fails to take either discipline seriously as multifaceted, complex sets of meaning."

In response to the book's reception, the Dutch author Frank Visser published an article addressing the book's detractors. From his perspective, Wilber's tome had "alarmed several critics, not too familiar with [the author's] works" even though (or perhaps, because) it represents "a view of reality which is large enough to absorb ANY conclusion of science—be it natural, human or spiritual—without giving science the last word".

In response to Visser's piece, Wilber drafted a reply saying that his "critics have completely missed" one "simple but essential point": by assuming "that in expanding science to include the higher realms", they had inferred he was "somehow reducing the higher realms to science". This misconception is negated because "even with an expanded definition of science", Wilber never reduces "the higher realms to science only, for there are the art and morals and science of the higher realms. And the art and morals have different specific methodologies than the sciences", as he had previously explained.

== See also ==
- Constructive empiricism
- Constructivism (philosophy of science)
- Contextualism
- Integral theory
- Integral (spirituality)
- Involution
- Jürgen Habermas
- Phenomenology
- Relationship between religion and science
- Signifier (floating)
- Validity (logic)

== Notes ==
=== References ===
- Alter, Robert (1995). "The Leveling Wind". New Republic. Vol. 212, no. 13. pp. 29–32.
- Hegel, G. W. F. (1833–36). Lectures on the History of Philosophy. Moscow, ID: University of Idaho.
- St. Bonaventure (1257). Breviloquium. Paterson, NJ: St. Anthony Guild Press.
- Walsh, Roger (1997). "Science and religion: proposals for reconciliation" (PDF). Journal of Transpersonal Psychology. 29: 123–142.
- Wilber, Ken (1998). The Marriage of Sense and Soul: Integrating Science and Religion. Broadway Books. ISBN 978-0767903431.
