= A Theory of Everything =

2000 book by Ken Wilber

- Cover of the first edition
- Author: Ken Wilber
- Language: English
- Subject: Integral theory
- Publisher: Shambhala Publications
- Publication date: 2000
- Publication place: United States
- Media type: Print
- Pages: 189
- ISBN: 978-1-57062-855-9

A Theory of Everything: An Integral Vision for Business, Politics, Science, and Spirituality is a 2000 book by Ken Wilber detailing the author's approach, called Integral theory, to building a conceptual model of the World that encompasses both its physical and spiritual dimensions. He posits a unified ground-of-everything he calls Spirit.

The book's first four chapters cover the physical and mental development of this unified ground. Beliefnet.com says that this book is, "Wilber's shortest, simplest overview of his work."

== See also ==
- Sex, Ecology, Spirituality – 1995 book by Ken Wilber
