= Worldcentrism =

Stage of ethical development

The American integral theorist Ken Wilber uses the term worldcentric to describe an advanced stage of ethical development. This involves a broadening of the spiritual horizon through the formulation of a transpersonal ethic in which we do not only desire the best for all people but for all living beings.

It is this aspect where worldcentrism is viewed as an expansion of sociocentrism where one focuses beyond self-needs to also extend care about the group, community, and society. The idea is that worldcentrism situates the positive aspects of egocentrism and sociocentrism in a larger context of concern so that consideration does not only include one's self or one's people but all peoples and all beings. Synonyms of worldcentric include global and planetary.

There are also worldcentrists who maintain that living beings engage in autopoiesis (self-making, self-producing, and self-repairing), which renders these beings as ends-in-themselves and of equal ground value, in addition to whatever extrinsic or intrinsic value they possess.

Wilber also sometimes refers to an ethical stage that is beyond the worldcentric, which he calls kosmocentric. In a kosmocentric awareness, one experiences a release of attachments of the gross realm and a radical recognition of evolutionary processes so that an individual is compassionately called to action and becomes capable of letting the gravity of outcomes go. Wilber used to associate these advanced ethical stages with mystical states, but since 2002 he has associated these advanced ethical stages with the development of complexity in the self-related lines of identity, studied by Susanne Cook-Greuter. By 2021 he had identified several levels of consciousness, with worldcentrism being at the fifth level.

== See also ==
- Biocentrism (ethics)
- Cosmopolitanism
- Cosmopolitan democracy
- Democratic globalization
- Global citizens movement
- Global citizenship
- Global city
- Global justice
- Mundialization
- Postnationalism
- Sennacieca Asocio Tutmonda
- Transnationalism
- World government
