= Marc Gafni =

American writer and former rabbi (born 1960)

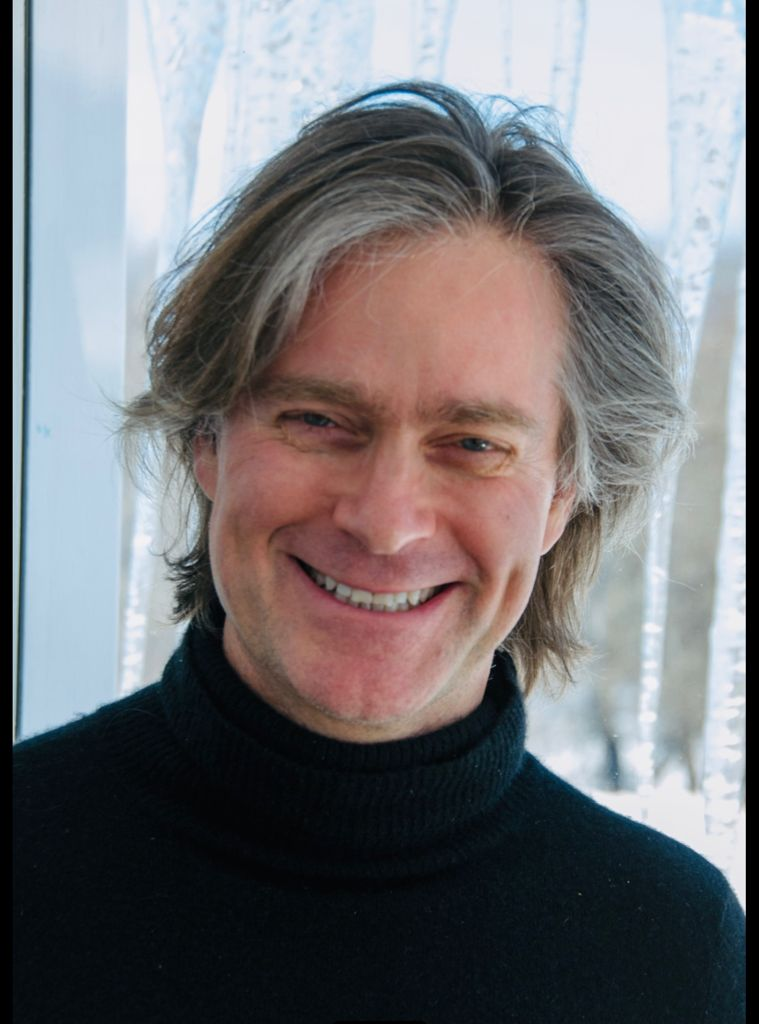
- Marc Gafni
- Born: Marc Winiarz; 1960 (age 65–66); Pittsfield, Massachusetts, U.S.
- Other names: Mordechai Gafni, Mark Gafni, Mordechai Winiarz, Mordechai Winyarz
- Occupations: Philosopher, writer
- Spouse: Chaya (m. 1998; div. 2004)
- Children: 3

Academic background
- Education: Queens College, Oxford University
- Alma mater: Oxford University
- Thesis: The Theology of Acosmic Humanism: Mordechai Lainer of Izbica (2006)

Academic work
- Discipline: Theology, Religious Studies
- Sub-discipline: New Age spirituality
- Institutions: Center for Integral Wisdom
- Website: www.marcgafni.com

Marc Gafni (born Marc Winiarz; 1960) is an American philosopher, writer, and former rabbi who became a New Age spiritual teacher with a focus on integral theory, eros, and "outrageous love". He is the president of the Center for Integral Wisdom, which he co-founded with Ken Wilber, and he is the co-founder and co-president of the Office for the Future. He is the author of Radical Kabbalah and Your Unique Self: The Radical Path to Personal Enlightenment, which won USA Book News Awards in 2012.

Gafni's teachings, often described as integral or world spirituality, aimed to transcend traditional religious boundaries and offer a modern, inclusive approach to spiritual practice. In the late 1990s, Gafni made a significant impact in Israel by founding the Bayit Hadash spiritual center in Jaffa and hosting a popular television program, Tahat Gafno, on Israel's Channel 2. His work during this period was characterized by a blend of traditional Jewish teachings with contemporary spiritual themes, appealing to a diverse audience seeking a deeper connection to spirituality outside conventional religious frameworks. Gafni's 2003 book, Mystery of Love, further established his reputation as a provocative thinker on the subjects of eros, sexuality, and relationships.

However, Gafni's career has been marred by serious allegations of sexual misconduct. In 2004, he faced accusations of sexual assault during the 1980s from two women who were teenagers at the time. Despite Gafni's denials and attempts to frame the relationships as consensual, the allegations led to significant fallout, including the return of his rabbinical ordination to Rabbi Shlomo Riskin. More allegations emerged in 2006 from attendees of the Bayit Hadash center, resulting in its closure and further tarnishing Gafni's reputation. In 2016, further fallout was triggered in part by an article in The New York Times.

In recent years, Gafni has continued to be a polarizing figure. He co-founded the Center for World Spirituality, later the Center for Integral Wisdom, with support from prominent figures like Ken Wilber and John Mackey. Despite ongoing allegations and public disavowals from former supporters, Gafni has persisted in his spiritual and philosophical work, publishing books such as Radical Kabbalah and A Return to Eros.

== Early life and education ==
Marc Winiarz was born in 1960 to Holocaust survivors in Pittsfield, Massachusetts. He was educated at Modern-Orthodox yeshivas in the New York City area. In the 1980s, while attending Yeshiva University, he worked with Jewish Public School Youth (JPSY), an organization providing Jewish social clubs in public schools. He majored in philosophy as an undergraduate at Queens College and earned his Doctorate in Philosophy from Wolfson College at Oxford University. His doctoral thesis was entitled, The Theology of Acosmic Humanism: Mordechai Lainer of Izbica.

== Early career in Israel ==
In 1988, Winiarz first worked as a rabbi in Boca Raton, Florida. After making aliyah, he moved to Israel and Hebraicized his name. (Note: "Winiarz", Polish for "vintner", is related to the Hebrew word gefen (גפן), which means "grape"—thus the name "Gafni".) Once in Israel, Mordechai Gafni served as rabbi of the West Bank settlement of Tzofim. He received Orthodox semikhah in 2004 from Rabbi Shlomo Riskin and Renewal semikhah in 2015 from Rabbi Zalman Schachter-Shalomi.

In the late 1990s, Gafni opened the Bayit Hadash (Hebrew: בית חדש, lit. 'new home') spiritual center in Jaffa. From 1999 to 2002, Gafni also hosted Tahat Gafno (Hebrew: תחת גפנו, lit. 'under his vine'), a television program broadcast on Israel's Channel 2. Gafni also did a series of weekly television spots with Israeli comedian Gil Kopatch on biblical wisdom for everyday life.

Gafni's teachings during this period have been described as integral or world spirituality, incorporating traditional religious studies with contemporary themes, aimed at spirituality for people who do not identify with one specific religion. Gafni described himself and his students as "dual citizens" of both their native traditional religion and the broader themes of "world spirituality". He wrote an essay, "A Hundred Blasts Shatter the Somber Silence", which appeared in Arthur Kurzweil's Best Jewish Writing 2003. His 2003 book, Mystery of Love, advocated for a new set of teachings centered around eros, sexuality, and relationships.

=== Allegations of sexual assault ===
In 2004, Gafni was accused by two women of sexual assaulting them during the 1980s when they were teenagers. In 2004, he acknowledged a nine-month relationship with a 14-year-old girl when he was 19. He denied the relationship was abusive, describing it as consensual. As a result of these allegations, Gafni returned his rabbinical ordination from Rabbi Shlomo Riskin to spare his former teacher "any further embarrassment" after Riskin expressed he wanted to revoke Gafni's ordination on the grounds that Gafni's theology had extended "beyond the bounds of Orthodoxy".

=== Bayit Hadash allegations ===
In 2006, Gafni was accused by five women who attended the Bayit Hadash (Hebrew: בית חדש, lit. 'new home') spiritual center in Jaffa, which Gafni had opened in the late 1990s. Gafni acknowledged relationships with some of the women. However, he characterized the relationships as consensual and supported this by posting polygraph results on his website. Because of the allegations, and because Gafni fled the country to avoid prosecution, he was dismissed from Bayit Hadash, which closed within days. The Bayit Hadash co-founders and other prominent leaders expressed that they felt betrayed by how deeply Gafni had misled them as well as regret for having supported him. His rabbinical ordination by Reb Zalman Schachter-Shalomi was revoked, and the Alliance for Jewish Renewal condemned Gafni's behavior, stating that "Marc Gafni is not a rabbi or spiritual leader recognized by ALEPH: Alliance for Jewish Renewal."

Once back in the United States, Gafni sent a remorseful letter to his congregation saying he regretted his actions and added "Clearly all of this and more indicates that in these regards I am sick. I need to acknowledge that sickness and to get help for it."

== Center for World Spirituality ==
In 2011, Marc Gafni, Sally Kempton, and Lori Galperin founded the Center for World Spirituality, which later evolved into the Center for Integral Wisdom. At the Center, Gafni and Ken Wilber founded a Wisdom Council to envision a spirituality based on Integral Principles. The Wisdom Council, which is no longer active, included members such as Gafni, Wilber, Tony Robbins, Warren Farrell, Lori Galperin, Sally Kempton. The co-chair of Center for World Spirituality was Whole Foods CEO John Mackey.

Gafni was a Scholar in Residence at the Integral Institute and the Director of the Integral Spiritual Experience but was asked to leave after allegations of sexual involvement with a student were raised. Integral Life, one of Gafni's promoters, deleted his contributions from its website and announced that it was distancing itself from him. Tami Simon, CEO of Sounds True, canceled her planned publication of Gafni's book, Your Unique Self, and issued a statement denouncing him.

The board of directors of the Center for World Spirituality, issued a statement of "unequivocal support" for Gafni. Ken Wilber, after taking "a 90-day leave of absence", published a formal statement saying that he will "rejoin the Wisdom Council of The Center for World Spirituality", describing Gafni as a "gifted teacher" and a "genuine spiritual leader".

== Radical Kabbalah and Your Unique Self ==
Gafni wrote Radical Kabbalah, a two-volume work published by Integral Publishers in 2012. Zak Stein wrote a review of Radical Kabbalah in Integral Review calling it "a work that comes along once in a generation".

In 2012, Your Unique Self: The Radical Path to Personal Enlightenment was published by Integral Publishers, with a foreword written by Ken Wilber, It won a 2012 USA Best Book Awards in Spirituality: General category.

== Further allegations and repercussions ==
In January 2016, Judy Mitzner said that she was one of two teenage girls whom Gafni allegedly molested in New York City in 1986. She reiterated those assertions on the Dr. Phil show of January 19, 2018, in which Gafni appeared. Mitzner was 16 and Gafni was 24 and he was her Jewish Youth Leader at the time.

Also in January 2016, a woman wrote that she was married to Gafni from 1999 to 2004 in an anonymous opinion piece in The Times of Israel. The article was in response to a New York Times article about Gafni the preceding week. She catalogued what she described as her story of abuse and wrote that she had gone public to "Protect some girl. Protect some woman. Some student. Some unsuspecting soul."

Within two weeks of the publication of the piece in The Times of Israel, Sara Kabakov revealed in The Forward that she was the other formerly unnamed teenage girl who had been abused by Gafni in the early 1980s, beginning when she was thirteen years old. Gafni commented, "she was 14 going on 35, and I never forced her." In a subsequent article, The Forward published Gafni's response together with the analysis of sexual abuse experts. Gafni states they were 14 and 19 year old teenagers and describes their relationship as "a mutual expression of teenage love." (Note: Gafni included polygraph results to support his claim that his relationship with Kabakov was consensual. It was completed by Gordon Barland, the former director of polygraph research for the Department of Defense. Barland concluded that Gafni had answered each question truthfully although confidence in his conclusion was lower than would otherwise be the case due to the time elapsed.) Afterwards, Kabakov responded to Gafni's comments and reiterated her assertion that the relationship was not consensual.

A number of new-age spiritual leaders, who had previously worked with and endorsed Gafni, publicly withdrew their support and wrote a public statement disavowing him, including Deepak Chopra, Joan Borysenko, Andrew Harvey, Jean Houston, and Stephen Dinan. Also in 2016, triggered in part by an article in the New York Times, as well as by a petition from over 100 rabbis denouncing Gafni, a group of Gafni's close former students published a public letter disavowing him as a teacher, accusing him of multiple forms of abuse, deceptions, and betrayals, and explaining why they consider him to be dangerous.

Protesters also targeted Whole Foods due to the involvement of its CEO, John Mackey, with Gafni. Gafni wrote: "This group of protestors, led by many of my competing adversaries, is using Mackey as a platform to continue their smear campaign designed to destroy my reputation and career." Mackey issued a public statement, saying: "While combating sexual abuse or harassment is essential and something I fully support, so is providing a fair forum for those being wrongly accused. Publicly [sic] lashing out against someone based upon false or distorted information about sexual events is itself a form of abuse." John Mackey rejected the demands that he should distance himself from Gafni with the following statement: "Loyalty and the presumption of innocence are important values to me, so I will not join those who are condemning him. I am, at once, presuming Marc's innocence and firmly standing against what he's accused of." In April 2016 it was learned that John Mackey had stepped down, as he had completed his role as chairman of the Center for Integral Wisdom board.

In February 2017, the National Coalition for Men published an article by Gafni in which he defended himself, calling the allegations "a long-standing smear campaign". In 2020, Kabakov and Mitzner filed suit against both Gafni and Yeshiva University under the recently passed New York Child Victims Act.

== A Return to Eros ==
In 2017, Gafni published A Return to Eros: The Radical Experience of Being Fully Alive, co-authored with Kristina Kincaid.

Gafni expresses that "the sexual is the ultimate Spiritual Master" and has written "I was convinced from an early age that religion had lost what I believed must have been its original erotic vitality. I knew that the sexual, if liberated and ethically expressed, must somehow hold the mystery of return to the much larger-than-sexual Eros."

Zak Stein wrote an academic review of A Return to Eros, published under the title "Love in a Time Between Worlds: On the Metamodern 'Return' to a Metaphysics of Eros" in the journal Integral Review. Stein writes: "At the heart of A Return to Eros is a new metaphysical narrative about love and sex."

== Personal life ==
Gafni has married multiple times. He has three children from his first marriages. He married his third wife, Chaya, in 1998. They divorced in August 2004.Gafni has been married for many years to his writing and teaching partner, Dr. Kristina Kincaid.

== Publications ==
- Gafni, Mordechai (October 1, 2000). "Shofar of Tears". Tikkun. Vol. 15, no. 5.
- Gafni, Marc (2001). Soul Prints: Your Path to Fulfillment. Michael Joseph. ISBN 978-0-7434-1700-6.
  - Gafni, Marc (2002). Seelenmuster: der Schlüssel zur individuellen Lebensaufgabe und Erfüllung (in German). Arkana/Goldmann. ISBN 978-3-442-21606-2.
- Gafni, Mordechai (2003). "A Hundred Blasts Shatter the Somber Silence". In Kurzweil, Arthur (ed.). Best Jewish Writing 2003. Josey-Bass. pp. 200–205. ISBN 0-7879-6771-8.
- Gafni, Marc (2003). The Mystery of Love. Atria Books. ISBN 978-0-7434-4220-6.
- Gafni, Mordechai (April 1, 2003). "On the Erotic and the Ethical". Tikkun. Vol. 18, no. 2.
- Gafni, Marc (2012). Your Unique Self: The Radical Path to Personal Enlightenment. Integral Publishers. ISBN 978-1-4675-2277-9.
- Gafni, Marc (2012). Radical Kabbalah: Book 1. Integral Publishers. ISBN 978-1-4951-5912-1.
- Gafni, Marc (2012). Radical Kabbalah: Book 2. Integral Publishers. ISBN 978-1-4951-5913-8.
- Gafni, Marc (2014). Tears: Reclaiming Ritual, Integral Religion, and Rosh Hashanah. Integral Publishers. ISBN 978-0-9896827-4-9.
- Gafni, Marc (2014). Self in Integral Evolutionary Mysticism. Integral Publishers. ISBN 978-0-9896827-8-7.
- Gafni, Marc; Maloney, Kate (2014). Your Unique Self: An Integral Path to Success 3.0. Integral Publishers. ISBN 978-0-9904419-3-9.
- Gafni, Marc; Kincaid, Kristina (2017). A Return to Eros: The Radical Experience of Being Fully Alive. BenBella Books. ISBN 978-1-944648-18-3.

== See also ==
- Polyamory
- Sexual ethics
