= Ken Wilber =

American writer and public speaker (born 1949)

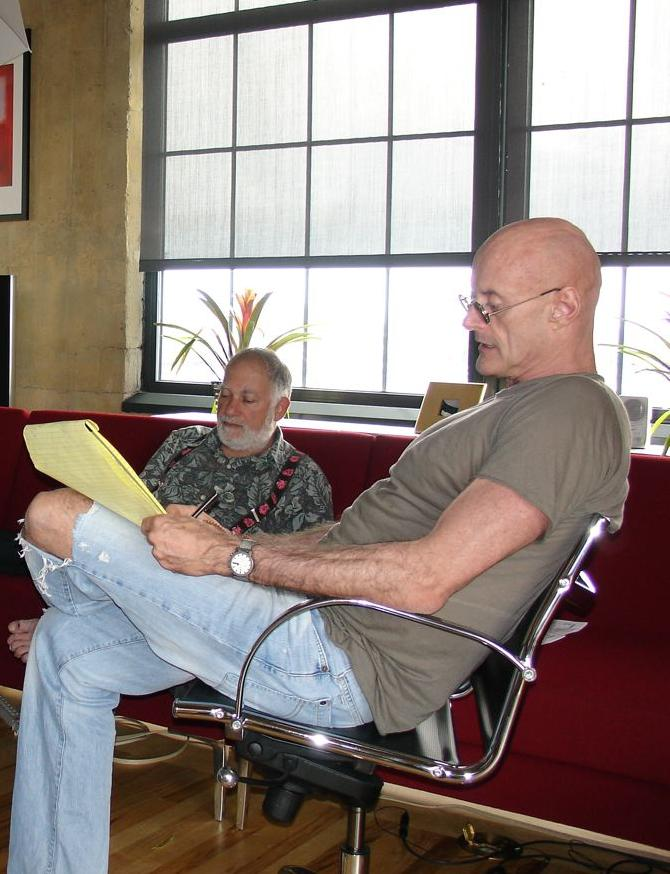
- Wilber in 2006 with Bernard Glassman (background)
- Born: Kenneth Earl Wilber Jr. January 31, 1949 (age 77); Oklahoma City, Oklahoma, United States

Education
- Education: Duke University (no degree); University of Nebraska–Lincoln (no degree)

Philosophical work
- Era: New Age
- Region: Western esotericism
- Main interests: Integral theory
- Notable works: The Spectrum of Consciousness (1977); The Atman Project (1980); Grace and Grit (1991); Sex, Ecology, Spirituality (1995, 2001)

Kenneth Earl Wilber Jr. (born January 31, 1949) is an American writer on transpersonal psychology and his own integral theory, a four-quadrant grid which purports to model all human knowledge and experience.

== Life and career ==
Wilber was born in 1949 in Oklahoma City. In 1967 he enrolled as a pre-med student at Duke University. He became interested in psychology and Eastern spirituality. He left Duke and enrolled at the University of Nebraska–Lincoln studying biochemistry, but after a few years dropped out of university and began studying his own curriculum and writing.

In 1973 Wilber completed his first book, The Spectrum of Consciousness, in which he sought to integrate knowledge from disparate fields. After rejections by more than 20 publishers it was accepted in 1977 by Quest Books, and he spent a year giving lectures and workshops before going back to writing, publishing The Atman Project, in which he put his idea of a spectrum of consciousness in a developmental order. He also helped to launch the journal ReVision in 1978.

In 1982, New Science Library published his anthology The Holographic Paradigm and Other Paradoxes, a collection of essays and interviews, including one by David Bohm. The essays, including one of his own, looked at how holography and the holographic paradigm relate to the fields of consciousness, mysticism, and science.

In 1983, Wilber married Terry "Treya" Killam who was shortly thereafter diagnosed with breast cancer. From 1984 until 1987, Wilber gave up most of his writing to care for her. Killam died in January 1989; their joint experience was recorded in the 1991 book Grace and Grit.

In 1987, Wilber moved to Boulder, Colorado, where he worked on his Kosmos trilogy and supervised the work and functioning of the Integral Institute.

Wilber wrote Sex, Ecology, Spirituality (1995), the first volume of his Kosmos Trilogy, presenting his "theory of everything," a four-quadrant grid in which he summarized his reading in psychology and Eastern and Western philosophy up to that time. A Brief History of Everything (1996) was the popularised summary of Sex, Ecology, Spirituality in interview format. The Eye of Spirit (1997) was a compilation of articles he had written for the journal ReVision on the relationship between science and religion. Throughout 1997, he had kept journals of his personal experiences, which were published in 1999 as One Taste, a term for unitary consciousness. Over the next two years his publisher, Shambhala Publications, released eight re-edited volumes of his Collected Works. In 1999, he finished Integral Psychology and wrote A Theory of Everything (2000). In A Theory of Everything Wilber attempts to bridge business, politics, science and spirituality and show how they integrate with theories of developmental psychology, such as Spiral Dynamics. His novel, Boomeritis (2002), attempts to expose what he perceives as the egotism of the baby boom generation. Frank Visser's Ken Wilber: Thought as Passion (2003), a guide to Wilber's thought, was praised by Edward J. Sullivan and Daryl S. Paulson, with the latter calling it "an outstanding synthesis of Wilber's published works through the evolution of his thoughts over time. The book will be of value to any transpersonal humanist or integral philosophy student who does not want to read all of Wilber's works to understand his message."

In 2012, Wilber joined the advisory board of the International Simultaneous Policy Organization which seeks to end the usual deadlock in tackling global issues through an international simultaneous policy.

Wilber stated in 2011 that he has long suffered from chronic fatigue syndrome, possibly caused by RNase enzyme deficiency disease.

== Integral theory ==
Upper-Left (UL) "I"; Interior Individual; Intentional e.g. Freud	Upper-Right (UR) "It"; Exterior Individual; Behavioral e.g. Skinner
Lower-Left (LL) "We"; Interior Collective; Cultural e.g. Gadamer	Lower-Right (LR) "Its"; Exterior Collective; Social e.g. Marx

All Quadrants All Levels (AQAL, pronounced "ah-qwul") is the basic framework of integral theory. It models human knowledge and experience with a four-quadrant grid, along the axes of "interior-exterior" and "individual-collective". According to Wilber, it is a comprehensive approach to reality, a metatheory that attempts to explain how academic disciplines and every form of knowledge and experience fit together coherently.

AQAL is based on four fundamental concepts and a rest-category: four quadrants, several levels and lines of development, several states of consciousness, and "types", topics which do not fit into these four concepts. "Levels" are the stages of development, from pre-personal through personal to transpersonal. "Lines" of development are various domains which may progress unevenly through different stages. "States" are states of consciousness; according to Wilber persons may have a temporal experience of a higher developmental stage. "Types" is a rest-category, for phenomena which do not fit in the other four concepts. In order for an account of the Kosmos to be complete, Wilber believes that it must include each of these five categories. For Wilber, only such an account can be accurately called "integral". In the essay, "Excerpt C: The Ways We Are in This Together", Wilber describes AQAL as "one suggested architecture of the Kosmos".

The model's apex is formless awareness, "the simple feeling of being", which is equated with a range of "ultimates" from a variety of eastern traditions. This formless awareness transcends the phenomenal world, which is ultimately only an appearance of some transcendental reality. According to Wilber, the AQAL categories — quadrants, lines, levels, states, and types – describe the relative truth of the two truths doctrine of Buddhism. According to Wilber, none of them are true in an absolute sense. Only formless awareness, "the simple feeling of being", exists absolutely.

== Other ideas ==
=== Mysticism and the great chain of being ===
One of Wilber's main interests is in mapping what he calls the "neo-perennial philosophy", an integration of some of the views of mysticism typified by Aldous Huxley's The Perennial Philosophy with an account of cosmic evolution akin to that of the Indian mystic Sri Aurobindo. He rejects most of the tenets of Perennialism and the associated anti-evolutionary view of history as a regression from past ages or yugas. (Note: "I have not identified myself with the perennial philosophy in over fifteen years ... Many of the enduring perennial philosophers—such as Nagarjuna—were already using postmetaphysical methods, which is why their insights are still quite valid. But the vast majority of perennial philosophers were caught in metaphysical, not critical, thought, which is why I reject their methods almost entirely, and accept their conclusions only to the extent they can be reconstructed.") Instead, he embraces a more traditionally Western notion of the great chain of being. As in the work of Jean Gebser, this great chain (or "nest") is ever-present while relatively unfolding throughout this material manifestation, although to Wilber "... the 'Great Nest' is actually just a vast morphogenetic field of potentials ..." In agreement with Mahayana Buddhism, and Advaita Vedanta, he believes that reality is ultimately a nondual union of emptiness and form, with form being innately subject to development over time.

=== Theory of truth ===
	Interior	Exterior
Individual	Standard: Truthfulness (1st person) (sincerity, integrity, trustworthiness)	Standard: Truth (3rd person) (correspondence, representation, propositional)
Collective	Standard: Justness (2nd person) (cultural fit, rightness, mutual understanding)	Standard: Functional fit (3rd person) (systems theory web, Structural functionalism, social systems mesh)

Wilber believes that the mystical traditions of the world provide access to, and knowledge of, a transcendental reality which is perennial, consistent throughout all times and cultures. This proposition underlies the whole of his conceptual edifice, and is an unquestioned assumption. According to David L. McMahan, the perennial position is "largely dismissed by scholars", but "has lost none of its popularity". Mainstream academia favor a constructivist approach, which is rejected by Wilber as a dangerous relativism. Wilber juxtaposes this generalization to plain materialism, presented as the main paradigm of regular science. (Note: Wilber: "Are the mystics and sages insane? Because they all tell variations on the same story, don't they? The story of awakening one morning and discovering you are one with the All, in a timeless and eternal and infinite fashion. Yes, maybe they are crazy, these divine fools. Maybe they are mumbling idiots in the face of the Abyss. Maybe they need a nice, understanding therapist. Yes, I'm sure that would help. But then, I wonder. Maybe the evolutionary sequence really is from matter to body to mind to soul to spirit, each transcending and including, each with a greater depth and greater consciousness and wider embrace. And in the highest reaches of evolution, maybe, just maybe, an individual's consciousness does indeed touch infinity—a total embrace of the entire Kosmos—a Kosmic consciousness that is Spirit awakened to its own true nature. It's at least plausible. And tell me: is that story, sung by mystics and sages the world over, any crazier than the scientific materialism story, which is that the entire sequence is a tale told by an idiot, full of sound and fury, signifying absolutely nothing? Listen very carefully: just which of those two stories actually sounds totally insane?")

In his later works, Wilber argues that manifest reality is composed of four domains, and that each domain, or "quadrant", has its own truth-standard, or test for validity (a relativist schema, in other words):

- "Interior individual/1st person": the subjective world, the individual subjective sphere;
- "Interior collective/2nd person": the intersubjective space, the cultural background;
- "Exterior individual/3rd person": the objective state of affairs;
- "Exterior collective/3rd person": the functional fit, "how entities fit together in a system".

=== Pre/trans fallacy ===
Wilber believes that many claims about non-rational states make a mistake he calls the pre/trans fallacy. According to Wilber, the non-rational stages of consciousness (what Wilber calls "pre-rational" and "trans-rational" stages) can be easily confused with one another. In Wilber's view, one can reduce trans-rational spiritual realization to pre-rational regression, or one can elevate pre-rational states to the trans-rational domain. For example, Wilber claims that Freud and Jung commit this fallacy. Freud considered mystical realization to be a regression to infantile oceanic states. Wilber alleges that Freud thus commits a fallacy of reduction. Wilber thinks that Jung commits the converse form of the same mistake by considering pre-rational myths to reflect divine realizations. Likewise, pre-rational states may be misidentified as post-rational states. Wilber characterizes himself as having fallen victim to the pre/trans fallacy in his early work.

=== Wilber on science ===
Wilber describes the state of the "hard" sciences as limited to "narrow science", which only allows evidence from the lowest realm of consciousness, the sensorimotor (the five senses and their extensions). Wilber sees science in the broad sense as characterized by involving three steps:

- specifying an experiment,
- performing the experiment and observing the results, and
- checking the results with others who have competently performed the same experiment.

He has presented these as "three strands of valid knowledge" in Part III of his book The Marriage of Sense and Soul.

What Wilber calls "broad science" would include evidence from logic, mathematics, and from the symbolic, hermeneutical, and other realms of consciousness. Ultimately and ideally, broad science would include the testimony of meditators and spiritual practitioners. Wilber's own conception of science includes both narrow science and broad science, e.g., using electroencephalogram machines and other technologies to test the experiences of meditators and other spiritual practitioners, creating what Wilber calls "integral science".

According to Wilber's theory, narrow science trumps narrow religion, but broad science trumps narrow science. That is, the natural sciences provide a more inclusive, accurate account of reality than any of the particular exoteric religious traditions. But an integral approach that uses intersubjectivity to evaluate both religious claims and scientific claims will give a more complete account of reality than narrow science.

Wilber has referred to Stuart Kauffman, Ilya Prigogine, Alfred North Whitehead, and others who also articulate his vitalistic and teleological understanding of reality, which is deeply at odds with the modern evolutionary synthesis. (Note: Wilber: "I am not alone in seeing that chance and natural selection by themselves are not enough to account for the emergence that we see in evolution. Stuart Kaufman [sic] and many others have criticized mere change and natural selection as not adequate to account for this emergence (he sees the necessity of adding self-organization). Of course I understand that natural selection is not acting on mere randomness or chance—because natural selection saves previous selections, and this reduces dramatically the probability that higher, adequate forms will emerge. But even that is not enough, in my opinion, to account for the remarkable emergence of some of the extraordinarily complex forms that nature has produced. After all, from the big bang and dirt to the poems of William Shakespeare is quite a distance, and many philosophers of science agree that mere chance and selection are just not adequate to account for these remarkable emergences. The universe is slightly tilted toward self-organizing processes, and these processes—as Prigogine was the first to elaborate—escape present-level turmoil by jumping to higher levels of self-organization, and I see that "pressure" as operating throughout the physiosphere, the biosphere, and the noosphere. And that is what I metaphorically mean when I use the example of a wing (or elsewhere, the example of an eyeball) to indicate the remarkableness of increasing emergence. But I don't mean that as a specific model or actual example of how biological emergence works! Natural selection carries forth previous individual mutations—but again that just isn't enough to account for creative emergence (or what Whitehead called "the creative advance into novelty," which, according to Whitehead, is the fundamental nature of this manifest universe).")

=== Later work ===
In 2005, at the launch of the Integral Spiritual Center, a branch of the Integral Institute, Wilber presented a 118-page rough draft summary of his two forthcoming books. The essay is entitled "What is Integral Spirituality?", and contains several new ideas, including Integral post-metaphysics and the Wilber-Combs lattice. In 2006, he published "Integral Spirituality", in which he elaborated on these ideas, as well as others such as Integral Methodological Pluralism and the developmental conveyor belt of religion.

"Integral post-metaphysics" is the term Wilber has given to his attempts to reconstruct the world's spiritual-religious traditions in a way that accounts for the modern and post-modern criticisms of those traditions.

The Wilber-Combs Lattice is a conceptual model of consciousness developed by Wilber and Allan Combs. It is a grid with sequential states of consciousness on the x axis (from left to right) and with developmental structures, or levels, of consciousness on the y axis (from bottom to top). This lattice illustrates how each structure of consciousness interprets experiences of different states of consciousness, including mystical states, in different ways.

Wilber attracted a lot of controversy from 2011 to the present day by supporting Marc Gafni, who was accused of sexually assaulting a minor, on his blog. A petition begun by a group of rabbis has called for Wilber to publicly dissociate from Gafni.

Wilber is on the advisory board of Mariana Bozesan's AQAL Capital GmbH, a Munich-based company specialising in integral impact investing using a model based on Wilber's Integral Theory.

== Influences ==
Wilber's views have been influenced by Madhyamaka Buddhism, particularly as articulated in the philosophy of Nagarjuna. Wilber has practiced various forms of Buddhist meditation, studying (however briefly) with a number of teachers, including Dainin Katagiri, Taizan Maezumi, Chogyam Trungpa Rinpoche, Kalu Rinpoche, Alan Watts, Carl Jung, Penor Rinpoche and Chagdud Tulku Rinpoche. Advaita Vedanta, Trika (Kashmir) Shaivism, Tibetan Buddhism, Zen Buddhism, Ramana Maharshi, and Andrew Cohen can be mentioned as further influences. Wilber has on several occasions singled out Adi Da's work for the highest praise while expressing reservations about Adi Da as a teacher. In Sex, Ecology, Spirituality, Wilber refers extensively to Plotinus' philosophy, which he sees as nondual. While Wilber has practised Buddhist meditation methods, he does not identify himself as a Buddhist.

According to Frank Visser, Wilber's conception of four quadrants, or dimensions of existence is very similar to E. F. Schumacher's conception of four fields of knowledge. Visser finds Wilber's conception of levels, as well as Wilber's critique of science as one-dimensional, to be very similar to that in Huston Smith's Forgotten Truth. Visser also writes that the esoteric aspects of Wilber's theory are based on the philosophy of Sri Aurobindo as well as other theorists including Adi Da.

== Reception ==
Wilber has been categorized by Wouter J. Hanegraaff as New Age due to his emphasis on a transpersonal view. Publishers Weekly has called him "the Hegel of Eastern spirituality".

Wilber is credited with broadening the appeal of a "perennial philosophy" to a much wider audience. Cultural figures as varied as Bill Clinton, Al Gore, Deepak Chopra, Richard Rohr, and musician Billy Corgan have mentioned his influence. Paul M. Helfrich credits him with "precocious understanding that transcendental experience is not solely pathological, and properly developed could greatly inform human development".

However, Wilber's approach has been criticized as excessively categorizing and objectifying, masculinist, commercializing spirituality, and denigrating of emotion. Critics in multiple fields cite problems with Wilber's interpretations and inaccurate citations of his wide ranging sources, as well as stylistic issues with gratuitous repetition, excessive book length, and hyperbole.

Frank Visser writes that Wilber's 1977 book The Spectrum of Consciousness was praised by transpersonal psychologists, but also that support for him "even in transpersonal circles" had waned by the early 1990s. Edward J. Sullivan argued, in his review of Visser's guide Ken Wilber: Thought as Passion, that in the field of composition studies "Wilber's melding of life’s journeys with abstract theorizing could provide an eclectic and challenging model of 'personal-academic' writing", but that "teachers of writing may be critical of his all-too-frequent totalizing assumptions". Sullivan also said that Visser's book overall gave an impression that Wilber "should think more and publish less."

Steve McIntosh praises Wilber's work but also argues that Wilber fails to distinguish "philosophy" from his own Vedantic and Buddhist religion. Christopher Bache is complimentary of some aspects of Wilber's work, but calls Wilber's writing style glib.

Psychiatrist Stanislav Grof has praised Wilber's knowledge and work in the highest terms; however, Grof has criticized the omission of the pre- and peri-natal domains from Wilber's spectrum of consciousness, and Wilber's neglect of the psychological importance of biological birth and death. Grof has described Wilber's writings as having an "often aggressive polemical style that includes strongly worded ad personam attacks and is not conducive to personal dialogue." Wilber's response is that the world religious traditions do not attest to the importance that Grof assigns to the perinatal.

== Works ==
=== Books ===
- The Spectrum of Consciousness, 1977, anniv. ed. 1993: ISBN 0-8356-0695-3
- No Boundary: Eastern and Western Approaches to Personal Growth, 1979, reprint ed. 2001: ISBN 1-57062-743-6
- The Atman Project: A Transpersonal View of Human Development, 1980, 2nd ed. ISBN 0-8356-0730-5
- Up from Eden: A Transpersonal View of Human Evolution, 1981, new ed. 1996: ISBN 0-8356-0731-3
- The Holographic Paradigm and Other Paradoxes: Exploring the Leading Edge of Science (editor), 1982, ISBN 0-394-71237-4
- A Sociable God: A Brief Introduction to a Transcendental Sociology, 1983, new ed. 2005 subtitled Toward a New Understanding of Religion, ISBN 1-59030-224-9
- Eye to Eye: The Quest for the New Paradigm, 1984, 3rd rev. ed. 2001: ISBN 1-57062-741-X
- Quantum Questions: Mystical Writings of the World's Great Physicists (editor), 1984, rev. ed. 2001: ISBN 1-57062-768-1
- Transformations of Consciousness: Conventional and Contemplative Perspectives on Development (co-authors: Jack Engler, Daniel Brown), 1986, ISBN 0-394-74202-8
- Spiritual Choices: The Problem of Recognizing Authentic Paths to Inner Transformation (co-authors: Dick Anthony, Bruce Ecker), 1987, ISBN 0-913729-19-1
- Grace and Grit: Spirituality and Healing in the Life of Treya Killam Wilber, 1991, 2nd ed. 2001: ISBN 1-57062-742-8
- Sex, Ecology, Spirituality: The Spirit of Evolution, 1st ed. 1995, 2nd rev. ed. 2001: ISBN 1-57062-744-4
- A Brief History of Everything, 1st ed. 1996, 2nd ed. 2001: ISBN 1-57062-740-1
- The Eye of Spirit: An Integral Vision for a World Gone Slightly Mad, 1997, 3rd ed. 2001: ISBN 1-57062-871-8
- The Essential Ken Wilber: An Introductory Reader, 1998, ISBN 1-57062-379-1
- The Marriage of Sense and Soul: Integrating Science and Religion, 1998, reprint ed. 1999: ISBN 0-7679-0343-9
- One Taste: The Journals of Ken Wilber, 1999, rev. ed. 2000: ISBN 1-57062-547-6
- Integral Psychology: Consciousness, Spirit, Psychology, Therapy, 2000, ISBN 1-57062-554-9
- A Theory of Everything: An Integral Vision for Business, Politics, Science and Spirituality, 2000, paperback ed.: ISBN 1-57062-855-6
- Speaking of Everything (2-hour audio interview on CD), 2001
- Boomeritis: A Novel That Will Set You Free, 2002, paperback ed. 2003: ISBN 1-59030-008-4
- Kosmic Consciousness (12½ hour audio interview on ten CDs), 2003, ISBN 1-59179-124-3
- With Cornel West, commentary on The Matrix, The Matrix Reloaded and The Matrix Revolutions and appearance in Return To Source: Philosophy & The Matrix on The Roots Of The Matrix, both in The Ultimate Matrix Collection, 2004
- The Simple Feeling of Being: Visionary, Spiritual, and Poetic Writings, 2004, ISBN 1-59030-151-X (selected from earlier works)
- The Integral Operating System (a 69-page primer on AQAL with DVD and 2 audio CDs), 2005, ISBN 1-59179-347-5
- Executive producer of the Stuart Davis DVDs Between the Music: Volume 1 and Volume 2.
- Integral Spirituality: A Startling New Role for Religion in the Modern and Postmodern World, 2006, ISBN 1-59030-346-6
- The One Two Three of God (3 CDs – interview, 4th CD – guided meditation; companion to Integral Spirituality), 2006, ISBN 1-59179-531-1
- Integral Life Practice Starter Kit (five DVDs, two CDs, three booklets), 2006, ISBN 0-9772275-0-2
- The Integral Vision: A Very Short Introduction to the Revolutionary Integral Approach to Life, God, the Universe, and Everything, 2007, ISBN 1-59030-475-6
- The Integral Vision: A Very Short Introduction, 2007, ISBN 9781611806427
- Integral Life Practice: A 21st-Century Blueprint for Physical Health, Emotional Balance, Mental Clarity, and Spiritual Awakening, 2008, ISBN 1-59030-467-5
- The Pocket Ken Wilber, 2008, ISBN 1-59030-637-6
- The Integral Approach: A Short Introduction by Ken Wilber, eBook, 2013, ISBN 9780834829060
- The Fourth Turning: Imagining the Evolution of an Integral Buddhism, eBook, 2014, ISBN 9780834829572
- Wicked & Wise: How to Solve the World's Toughest Problems, with Alan Watkins, 2015, ISBN 978-1-909273-64-1
- Integral Meditation: Mindfulness as a Way to Grow Up, Wake Up, and Show Up in Your Life, 2016, ISBN 9781611802986
- The Religion of Tomorrow: A Vision For The Future of the Great Traditions, 2017, ISBN 978-1-61180-300-6
- Trump and a Post-Truth World, 2017, ISBN 9781611805611
- Integral Buddhism: And the Future of Spirituality, 2018, ISBN 1611805600
- Integral Politics: Its Essential Ingredients , eBook, 2018
- Grace and Grit, 2020, Shambhala, ISBN 9781611808490
- Finding Radical Wholeness: The Integral Path to Unity, Growth, and Delight, 2024, Shambhala, ISBN 978-1645471851
- A Post-Truth World: Politics, Polarization, and a Vision for Transcending the Chaos, Shambhala, 2024 ISBN 9781645473558

=== Audiobooks ===
- A Brief History of Everything. Shambhala Audio, 2008. ISBN 978-1-59030-550-8
- Kosmic Consciousness. Sounds True Incorporated, 2003. ISBN 9781591791249

=== Adaptations ===
Wilber's account of his wife Treya's illness and death, Grace and Grit (1991), was released as a feature film starring Mena Suvari and Stuart Townsend in 2021.

== See also ==
- The Cultural Creatives
- Edward Haskell
- Diane Musho Hamilton
- Higher consciousness
- Nicolai Hartmann
- Noosphere
- Shambhala Publications
- Worldcentrism
