= Michael E. Zimmerman =

American philosopher

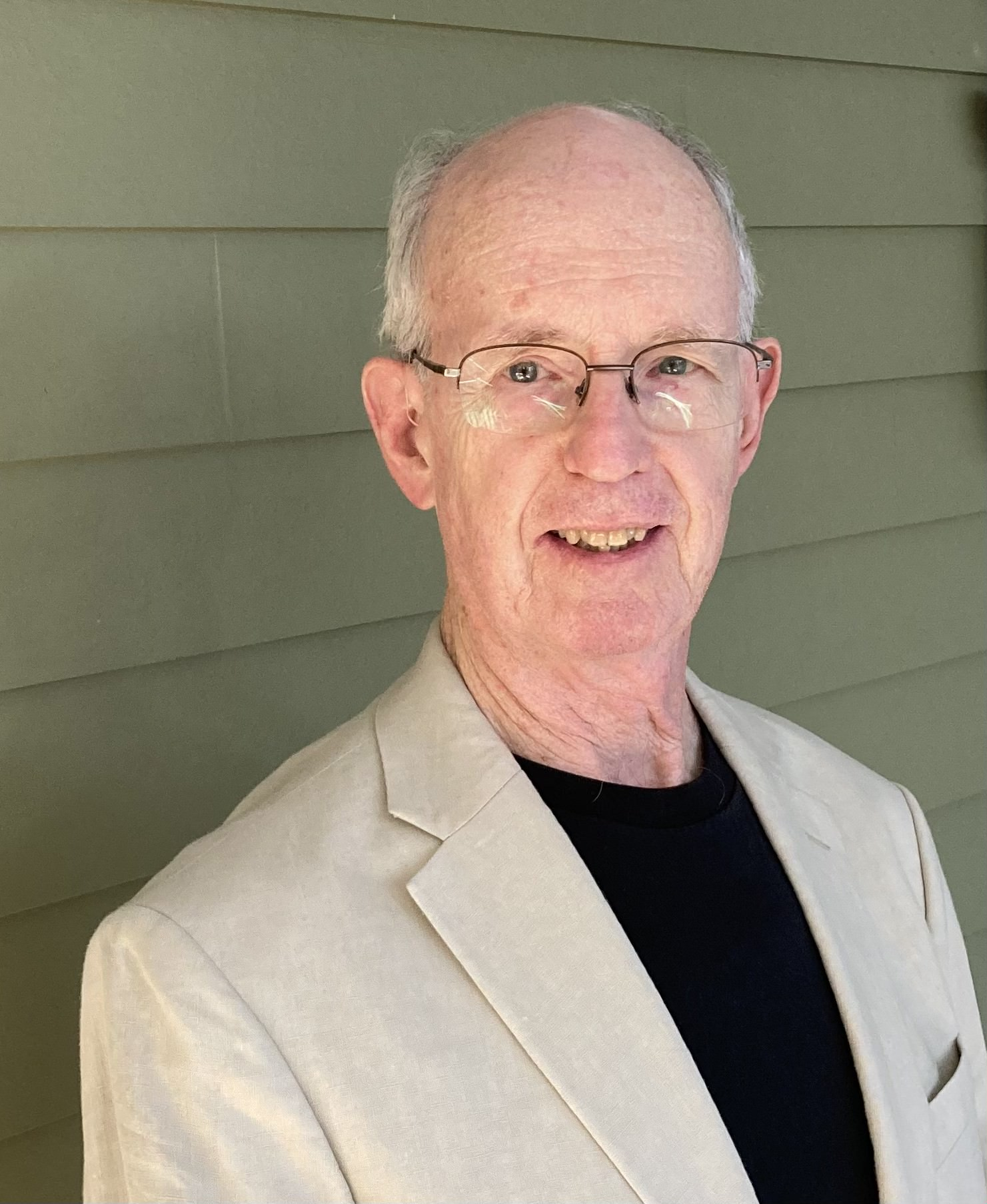
- Born: July 7, 1946 (age 80)
- Occupations: Philosopher, integral theorist, author and academic

Academic background
- Education: B.A. Philosophy; M.A. Philosophy; Ph.D. Philosophy
- Alma mater: Louisiana State University; Tulane University
- Thesis: The concept of self in Martin Heidegger's "Being and Time." (1974)

Academic work
- Institutions: Tulane University

Michael E. Zimmerman is an American philosopher, author, and academic with interests in integral theory. He is a Professor Emeritus of Philosophy for Tulane University and University of Colorado at Boulder (CU Boulder).

Zimmerman's research revolves around environmental philosophy, philosophy of technology, and integral theory with books and articles focusing on anthropogenic environmental issues and Martin Heidegger's philosophy. While critiquing the command-and-control approach to nature associated with modernity, he highlighted the dangers posed by anti-modernist attitudes found in certain environmentalist perspectives. His anthology Environmental Philosophy: From Animal Rights to Radical Ecology was the first to include essays on deep ecology and he helped develop an integrative model for anthropogenic environmental problems presented in Integral Ecology: Uniting Multiple Perspectives on the Natural World. He also authored Eclipse of the Self: The Development of Heidegger's Concept of Authenticity, Heidegger's Confrontation with Modernity, Technology, Politics, and Art and Contesting Earth's Future: Radical Ecology and Postmodernity.

== Education ==
From 1964 to 1968, Zimmerman pursued his Bachelor of Arts degree in Philosophy at Louisiana State University. In the academic year of 1969, he enrolled in the graduate program in philosophy at Tulane University. In 1972 he received his Master's Degree in Philosophy and was also granted a Fulbright-Hays Fellowship at l'Université Catholique de Louvain before completing his Doctor of Philosophy degree at Tulane University in 1974.

== Career ==
Zimmerman began his academic career as an assistant professor at Denison University in 1974 before moving to Tulane University, where he held positions as assistant professor from 1975 to 1978, associate professor from 1978 to 1983, and then attained the rank of professor in 1983. During his time at Tulane, he served as the chair of the Department of Philosophy (1989-1993), (1999-2002), (2004-2006), and was the co-director of the Tulane Environmental Studies Program. He served as a clinical professor of psychology at Tulane School of Medicine from 1984 to 2006. At CU Boulder, he continued his tenure as a professor of philosophy, concurrently serving as director of the Center for Humanities and the Arts from 2006 to 2010. Additionally, he served on the executive committee of International Association for Environmental Philosophy (IAEP) and has been a professor emeritus of philosophy at both Tulane University and CU Boulder since 2015.

== Research ==
Zimmerman has used a multidisciplinary approach to understanding environmental issues with a specific focus on analyzing environmental problems stemming from human activities. He also raises the question of how to preserve the positive aspects of modernity, such as political freedoms, research, and religious liberties while addressing its environmental shortcomings.

During his Fulbright Fellowship in Brussels, Zimmerman's dissertation was influenced by Heidegger's new two-volume lectures on Nietzsche. In the 1980s, he authored three articles on the nuclear arms race, drawing on Heidegger's critiques of technological modernity. In 1992 he began collaborating with Harvard psychiatrist John E. Mack, who was researching alien abduction within the Program for Extraordinary Experience Research (PEER). His involvement with PEER concluded with Mack's passing in 2004, after which he focused on exploring the implications of Western metaphysics and science for AI and its potential impact on humanity. Developments such as the 2017 New York Times stories on government-funded UAP research have redirected him towards alien abductions and UAP/UFO phenomena, alongside considerations of their possible connections to the nuclear arms race and AI.

=== Heidegger on authenticity and philosophy of technology ===
Zimmerman in his publication Eclipse of the Self: The Development of Heidegger's Concept of Authenticity delved into Martin Heidegger's concept of authenticity, tracing its evolution from "Being and Time" to his later philosophical reflections. Charles M. Sherover, in his review for the Journal of the History of Philosophy, praised his writing saying "The author brings a mastery of much of the Heidegger corpus and an amazingly extensive familiarity with the secondary literature." He analyzed the parallels between Heidegger's philosophy and Mahayana Buddhism, highlighting their joint critique of anthropocentrism and dualism by exploring how both traditions propose alternatives to Western perspectives.

Zimmerman explored Heidegger's perspective on technology, contending that it has led to a reductionist view of beings as mere resources for human use which marked the culmination of Western cultural and philosophical history. In his book Heidegger's Confrontation with Modernity, Technology, Politics, and Art, he explored Heidegger's views on technology and his association with National Socialism, providing insights into his concerns about work and production. Albert Borgmann, an American philosopher, wrote "If there is a need for crucial insight in Heidegger's thought, it needs a lucid and engaging interpreter like Zimmerman to become fruitful in this country". His book elaborated on Heidegger's connections to National Socialism and contrasted them with deep ecology, arguing that despite some similarities, Heidegger's philosophy and deep ecology are incompatible. In Contesting Earth's Future: Radical Ecology and Postmodernity, he provided an examination of radical ecology and its philosophical underpinnings by exploring its relationship to Heidegger's anti-technological thought. Carl L. Bankston's review of the book highlighted it as being "an excellent review of contemporary radical ecological theory and ideas related to the radical ecological theory".

=== Environmental philosophy and integral theory ===
Zimmerman examined the limitations of anthropocentric humanism in addressing environmental crises and advocated for a non-anthropocentric understanding of reality to foster harmonious coexistence with the Earth. He analyzed criticisms from deep ecologists and ecofeminists regarding the shortcomings of reform environmentalism and underscored the necessity of replacing patriarchal cultural constructs. His anthology Environmental Philosophy: From Animal Rights to Radical Ecology presented a curated selection of writings covering topics such as the social construction of nature and eco-phenomenology. In a special issue titled "The Environmental Challenge to Social and Political Philosophy," he discussed the 1994 "takings" bills in the U.S. Congress, which proposed compensating wetlands owners, sparking debates over property rights and environmental regulations.

Zimmerman applied the integral theory's framework, including the concept of quadrants and cultural moral development, to address conflicts like proposed forest clear-cutting. In Integral Ecology: Uniting Multiple Perspectives on the Natural World, he addressed the challenge of reconciling diverse ecological perspectives, providing a theoretical framework grounded in Integral Theory and Ken Wilber's AQAL model. Craig Chalquist commented in his review for the Ecopsychology journal praised it by writing "No book review can hope to do justice to the enormous amount of hard work that went into this publication." His work also examined the contemporary debate surrounding climate change, particularly the dilemma between adapting to climate change and reducing greenhouse gas emissions.

=== Anomalous phenomena: philosophical perspectives ===
Zimmerman's essay on the rising prominence of alien abduction in popular culture examined the broader societal inclination to suppress knowledge of such phenomena and its implications for scientific inquiry. In his 2003 book chapter "Encountering Alien Otherness", he explored the "alien abduction" phenomenon to detail a decade of research conducted with John E. Mack, discussing how Mack risked his reputation to share the findings of abduction experiences and the challenges for researchers in investigating this topic.

== Awards and honors ==
- 1972 – Fulbright-Hays Fellow, l'Université Catholique de Louvain
- 1979 – Mortar Board Award for Excellence in Teaching, Mortar Board
- 1989 – Fellowship, National Endowment for the Humanities
- 1999 – Contemplative Practice Grant, ACLS
- 2002-2003 – Interdisciplinary Teacher of the Year Award, Tulane University

== Bibliography ==
=== Selected books ===
- Eclipse of the Self: The Development of Heidegger's Concept of Authenticity (1981) ISBN 978-0821405703
- Heidegger's Confrontation with Modernity, Technology, Politics, and Art (1990) ISBN 978-0253368751
- Contesting Earth's Future: Radical Ecology and Postmodernity (1994) ISBN 978-0520084773
- Environmental Philosophy: From Animal Rights to Radical Ecology 4th Edition (2004) ISBN 978-0131126954
- Integral Ecology: Uniting Multiple Perspectives on the Natural World (2009) ISBN 978-1590304662

=== Selected articles ===
- Zimmerman, M. (1979). Technological Culture and the end of Philosophy. Research in philosophy and technology, 2, 137-145.
- Zimmerman, M. E. (1987). Feminism, deep ecology, and environmental ethics. Environmental Ethics, 9(1), 21-44.
- Zimmerman, M. E. (1997). The Alien Abduction Phenomenon: Forbidden Knowledge of Hidden Events. Philosophy Today 41 (2), 235-253.
- Zimmerman, M. E. (2008). The singularity: a crucial phase in divine self-actualization?. Cosmos and History: The Journal of Natural and Social Philosophy, 4(1-2), 347-371.
- Zimmerman, Michael E. (2009). Religious Motifs in Technological Posthumanism. Western Humanities Review (3), 67-83.
- Zimmerman, M. E. (2011). Last man or overman? Transhuman appropriations of a Nietzschean theme. The Hedgehog Review, 13(2), 31-45.
- Zimmerman, M. E. (2015) Heidegger on Techno-Posthumanism: Revolt against Finitude, or Doing What Comes Naturally? Perfecting Human Futures: Technology, Secularization, and Eschatology, ed. J. Benjamin Hurlbut and Hava Tirosh-Samuelson. Springer, 121-140.

== See also ==
- Integral theory
