= Sex, Ecology, Spirituality =

1995 book by Ken Wilber

- Author: Ken Wilber
- Language: English
- Subject: Philosophical naturalism
- Publisher: Shambhala Publications
- Publication date: 1995
- Publication place: United States
- Media type: Print
- Pages: 851
- ISBN: 978-1-57062-744-6

Sex, Ecology, Spirituality: The Spirit of Evolution is a 1995 book by American integral theorist Ken Wilber. Wilber intended it to be the first volume of a series called The Kosmos Trilogy, but subsequent volumes were never produced. The book has been both highly acclaimed by some reviewers and harshly criticized by others.

== Content ==
Published in 1995, the book is a work in which Wilber grapples with modern philosophical naturalism, attempting to show its insufficiency as an explanation of being, evolution, and the meaning of life. He also describes an approach, called vision-logic, which he finds qualified to succeed modernism.

Wilber's project in this book requires nothing less than a complete re-visioning of the history of Eastern and Western thought. There are four philosophers that Wilber finds to be of the highest importance:

- Plotinus, Neo-Platonic philosopher, who introduced the first nondual philosophy to the West
- Nagarjuna, Buddhist philosopher, who did the same in the East
- Friedrich Wilhelm Joseph von Schelling, German Idealist who created the first evolutionary nondual philosophy in the West and
- Sri Aurobindo, Hindu yogi and philosopher who did the same in the East

Wilber argues that the account of existence presented by the Enlightenment is incomplete—it ignores the spiritual and noetic components of existence. He accordingly avoids the term cosmos, which is associated with merely physical existence. He prefers the term kosmos to refer to the sum of manifest existence, which harks back to the usage of the term by the Pythagoreans and other ancient mystics. Wilber conceives of the Kosmos as consisting of several concentric spheres: matter (the physical universe) plus life (the vital realm) plus mind (the mental realm) plus soul (the psychic realm) plus Spirit (the spiritual realm).

== Structure and theses ==
In the introduction, Wilber describes the deeply dysteleological perspective of contemporary philosophical naturalism as "the philosophy of 'oops'". He describes the spiritual inadequacies of philosophical naturalism as the source of the contemporary world's menacing ecological crisis. He describes his methodology as outlining "orienting generalizations"—points on which agreement can be found that will reveal a shared world-space.

=== Book One ===
In the first chapter, "The Web of Life", Wilber uses Arthur Lovejoy's account of the Great Chain of Being to show how the mechanistic, materialistic modern worldview triumphed over the West's traditional, holistic, hierarchical view. The prevalence of pathological, dominating hierarchies throughout history, has given hierarchy a bad name. But hierarchy is ultimately inescapable. Thus, we should concentrate on discovering which hierarchies actually do exist and on healing them.

In the second chapter, "The Pattern That Connects", Wilber uses Arthur Koestler's account of holism and holarchy and Ludwig von Bertalanffy's General Systems Theory to describe approximately twenty tenets of all holons. Wilber calls the holistic version of the Great Chain of Being the "Great Nest of Spirit", because this account emphasizes that higher levels include, as well as transcend lower ones.

In the third chapter, "Individual And Social", Wilber describes Erich Jantsch's account of co-evolution and self-organizing systems.

In the fourth chapter, "A View From Within", Wilber describes what he calls two fundamental aspects of existence: the "Left-hand path" (interiority) and the "Right-hand path" (exteriority). Gross reductionism—atomism, for example—consists of reducing a whole to its parts. Subtle reductionism—systems theory, for example—consists of reducing the interior to the exterior. Charles Taylor's work is used to show that the Enlightenment paradigm suffers from both gross and subtle reductionism. When Individual and Social spheres are added to the Interior and Exterior aspects of existence, four quadrants emerge.

In the fifth chapter, "The Emergence Of Human Nature", Wilber uses Jean Gebser's account of the development of human consciousness to show how the West progressed from the magic to the mythic to the rational mentalities. This acknowledgment that all of existence is in development adds a third fundamental dimension—depth, or verticality—to Wilber's model of consciousness.

In the sixth chapter, "Magic, Mythic and Beyond", Wilber uses Jean Piaget's theory of developmental psychology to describe the individual development of the contemporary human being. The "Pre/Trans Fallacy" is described. This is Wilber's term for "romantic" approaches, like deep ecology and ecofeminism, that often mistake earlier and more exclusivist modes of being for more mature, more inclusive modes.

In the seventh chapter, "The Farther Reaches Of Human Nature", Wilber uses Jürgen Habermas' account of socio-cultural development to describe collective human development. Wilber describes vision-logic, a non-dominating, global awareness of holistic hierarchy, in which the pathological dissociations of Nature from Self, interiority from exteriority, and creativity from compassion are transformed into healthy differentiations. The validity claims of mystics are compared to Thomas Kuhn's account of scientific paradigms.

In the eighth chapter, "The Depths Of The Divine", Wilber uses the accounts of four mystics to describe the possibilities for further individual spiritual development: the Transcendentalist Ralph Waldo Emerson on nature mysticism, the Christian saint Teresa of Avila on deity mysticism, Meister Eckhart on formless mysticism, and the Hindu guru Ramana Maharshi on nondual mysticism.

=== Book Two ===
In the ninth chapter, "The Way Up Is The Way Down", Wilber describes Neo-Platonist Plotinus' nondual metaphysics. "Ascending" philosophies are those that embrace the One, or the Absolute. "Descending" philosophies are those that embrace the Many, or Plenitude. Both ascent (driven by Eros, or creativity) and descent (driven by Agape, or compassion) are indispensable for a healthy, whole view. Plato's metaphysics, which also included both ascending and descending drives, is described. Plotinus' attack on Gnosticism is described in order to trace differences between healthy and pathological approaches to ascent.

In the tenth chapter, "This-Worldly, Otherworldly", Wilber describes various attempts to repair modernism's fractured and flattened worldview, especially Schelling's existential idealism.

In the eleventh chapter, "Brave New World", Wilber describes the liberating advantages as well as the spiritually crippling disadvantages of the modern, scientific mentality.

In the twelfth chapter, "The Collapse Of The Kosmos", Wilber uses Taylor's account of the effects of the Enlightenment paradigm to show how vertical depth was collapsed into horizontal span and how the ascending drive was dissociated into the "Ego camp" (Immanuel Kant's and Johann Gottlieb Fichte's Transcendent Ego) and the "Eco camp" (Baruch Spinoza's deified Nature). Utilitarianism is described as mistaking sensory pleasure for Spirit, which ultimately resulted in a fixation on hedonism and sex in modern society.

In the thirteenth chapter, "The Dominance Of The Descenders", Wilber describes how the West tried to embrace the Many through science, but failed to embrace the One through mysticism. The result was the rise of Thanatos (Sigmund Freud's death drive), and Phobos (existential fear), which are the respective pathological versions of Agape and Eros.

In the fourteenth chapter, "The Unpacking Of God", Wilber describes aspects of particular historical nondual views that could possibly heal the noetic fissures in the West, especially spiritual practice as understood by Zen and Dzogchen.

The afterword, "At The Edge Of History", includes a meditation on Emptiness as the ground of Being in which all entities are ontologically healed.

== Reception ==
In a review of the book, Esalen co-founder and writer Michael Murphy described it as one of the four most important books of the 20th century (the others being Aurobindo's The Life Divine, Heidegger's Being and Time, and Whitehead's Process and Reality).

The cultural historian William Irwin Thompson harshly criticized Wilber's project, contending that systematic "theories of everything" were inherently misguided. He also dismissed Wilber's scholarly achievements as "undergraduate generalizations". A Publishers Weekly reviewer criticized the book as disorganized and wrote that Wilber “has unfortunately tried too hard to cram everything possible into this massive undertaking. The result is that even the hundreds of pages of notes (sometimes useful, sometimes merely repetitive) become a mass of ideas and names.”
