= Boomeritis =

2002 novel by Ken Wilber

Boomeritis: A Novel That Will Set You Free
- Author: Ken Wilber
- Language: English
- Published: 2002
- Publication place: United States
- Media type: Print (hardback & paperback)

Boomeritis: A Novel That Will Set You Free is a polemical 2002 novel by American philosopher Ken Wilber, principally designed to explain Wilber's integral theory and to explain his concept of "Boomeritis". Wilber characterizes this as the deadly combination of a modern egalitarian worldview with a deep unquestioned narcissism commonly held by Baby Boomers and their children in the green meme of Spiral Dynamics, as opposed to Wilber's universal integralism.

== Summary ==
The protagonist, "Ken Wilber", is a brilliant MIT student studying artificial intelligence. Ken believes that the future of evolution includes the departure of human consciousness from the physical realm, or "meatspace", and the transhuman merging of human intelligence with cyberspace.

Ken attends a series of lectures at an institution called the Integral Center (an obvious stand-in for the real life Integral Institute) which guides him towards a more expansive understanding of evolution and existence. These lectures are interposed with explicit descriptions of Ken's sexual fantasies with another character, Chloe.

== Concept ==
According to Wilber, "Boomeritis" describes a pathological belief system that afflicts Baby Boomers in particular. Boomeritis, in his view, is characterized by relativism, narcissism, and aversion to hierarchy. He believes that this attitude carried over to the so-called Generation X.

Wilber claims that he intended the novel to exhibit the traits of extreme post-modernism — irony, self-reference, noetic flatness — and thus to function as a literary reductio ad absurdum, assisting people, especially Baby Boomers, in overcoming the post-modern mentality.

== See also ==
- Generation X
- Postmodernism
