= Great chain of being =

Medieval Christian hierarchy of living beings

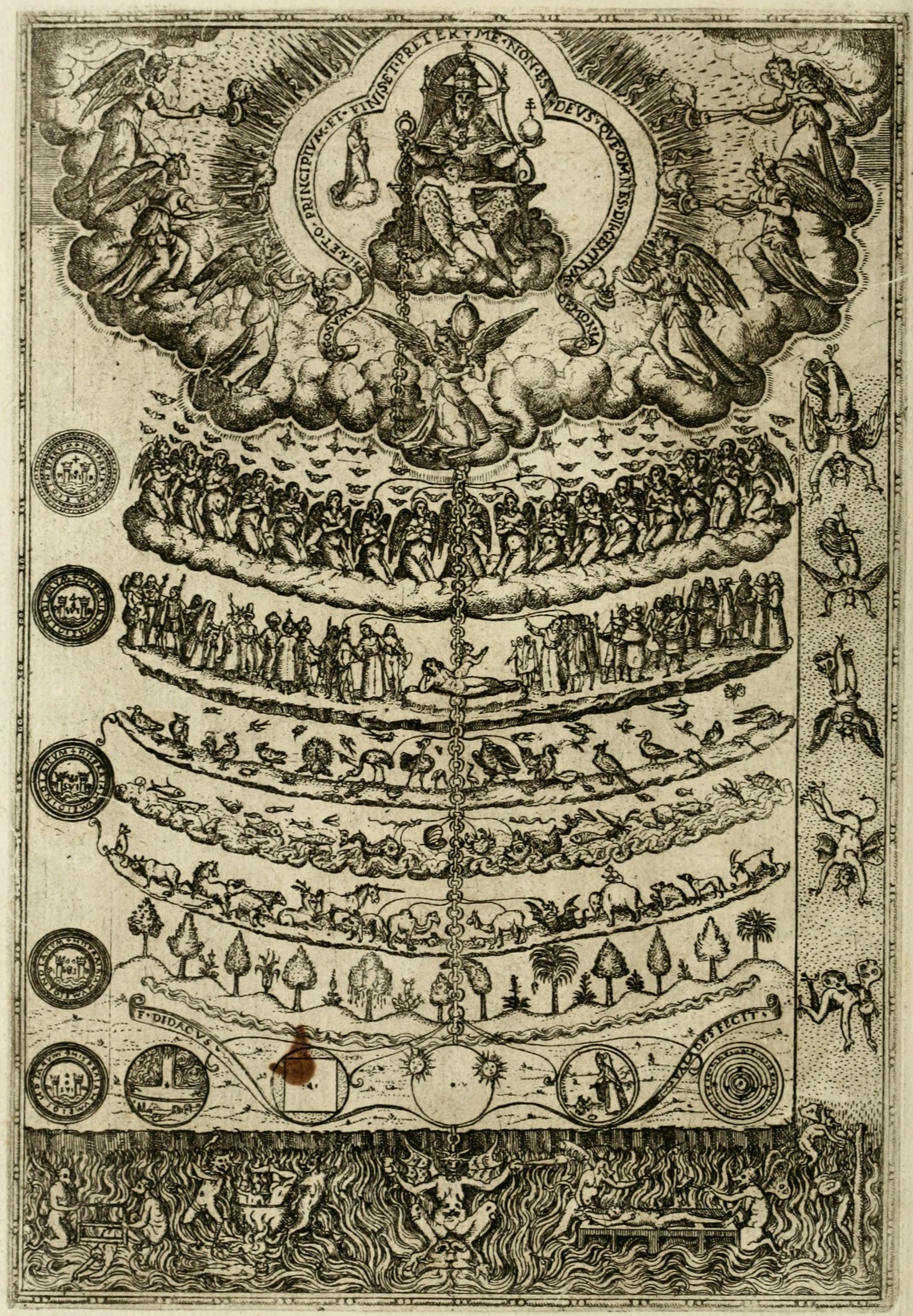
1579 drawing of the Great Chain of Being from Didacus Valades, Rhetorica Christiana

The great chain of being (from Latin scala naturae 'ladder of being') is a hierarchical structure of all matter and life, thought by the medieval Islamic world and medieval Christianity to have been decreed by God. The chain begins with God and descends through angels, humans, animals and plants to minerals.

The great chain of being is a concept derived from Plato, Aristotle (in his Historia Animalium), Plotinus and Proclus. Further developed during the Middle Ages, it reached full expression in early modern Neoplatonism.

== Divisions ==
The chain of being hierarchy consists of God at the top, above angels, which like him are entirely spirit, without material bodies, and hence unchangeable. Beneath them are humans, consisting both of spirit and matter; they change and die, and are thus essentially impermanent. Lower are animals and plants. At the bottom are the mineral materials of the earth itself; they consist only of matter. Thus, the higher the being is in the chain, the more attributes it has, including all the attributes of the beings below it. The minerals are, in the medieval mind, a possible exception to the immutability of the material beings in the chain, as alchemy promised to turn lower elements like lead into those higher up the chain, like silver or gold.

== The Great Chain ==
The Great Chain of being links God, angels, humans, animals, plants, and minerals. The links of the chain are:

=== God ===
Religions such as Judaism and Christianity hold that God created the entire universe and everything in it. He has spiritual attributes found in angels and humans. God has unique attributes of omnipotence, omnipresence, and omniscience. He is the model of perfection in all of creation.

=== Angelic beings ===
In the New Testament, the Epistle to the Colossians sets out a partial list: "everything visible and everything invisible, Thrones, Dominions, Sovereignties, Powers – all things were created through him and for him." The Epistle to the Ephesians also lists several entities: "Far above all principality, and power, and might, and dominion, and every name that is named, not only in this world, but also in that which is to come".

In the 5th and 6th centuries, Pseudo-Dionysius the Areopagite set out a more elaborate hierarchy, consisting of three lists, each of three types:

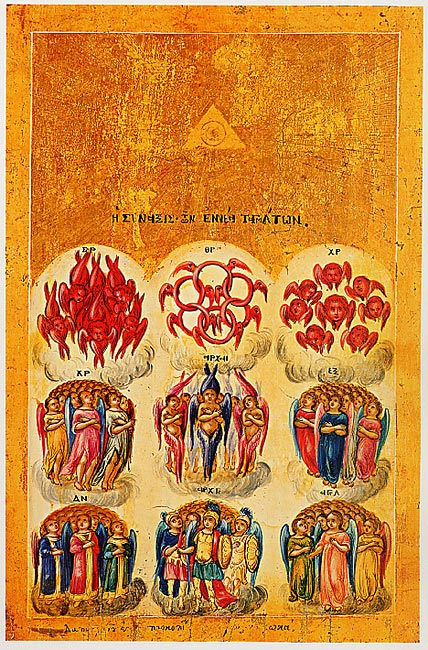
Eastern Orthodox icon of nine orders of angels

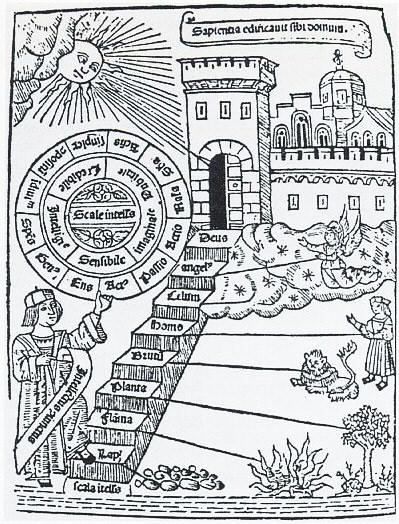
The mediaeval scala naturae as a staircase, implying the possibility of progress: Ramon Llull's Ladder of Ascent and Descent of the Mind, 1305

- Angels of presence, praising God
  - Seraphim – spirits of love
  - Cherubim – spirits of harmony
  - Thrones – record keepers of universal laws
- Angels of government, spreading light
  - Dominions – spirits of wisdom and knowledge
  - Virtues – angels of movement and free will
  - Powers – angels of form and space
- Angels of revelation, able to communicate with humans
  - Principalities – angels of time and personality
  - Archangels – powerful angels superior to ordinary angels
  - Angels – governors of spirits of nature

=== Humanity ===
Humans uniquely share spiritual attributes with God and the angels above them, love and language, and physical attributes with the animals below them, like having material bodies that experienced emotions and sensations such as lust and pain, as well as physical needs such as hunger and thirst.

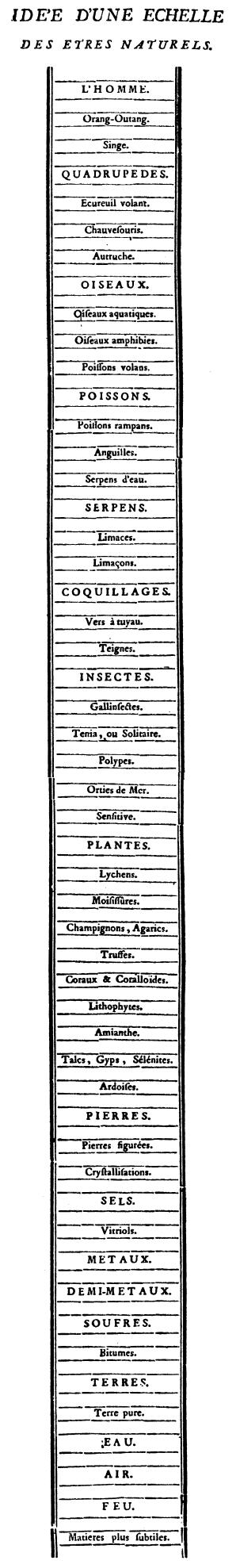
Charles Bonnet's chain of being from Traité d'insectologie, 1745

=== Animals ===
Animals have senses, are able to move, and have physical appetites. Apex predators like the lion could move vigorously, and has powerful senses like keen eyesight and the ability to smell their prey from a distance, while a lower order of animals might wiggle or crawl, or like oysters were sessile, attached to the sea-bed. All, however, share the senses of touch and taste.

=== Plants ===
Plants lack sense organs and the ability to move, but can grow and reproduce. The highest plants have important healing attributes within their leaves, buds, and flowers. Lower plants include fungi and mosses.

=== Minerals ===
At the bottom of the chain, minerals were unable to move, sense, grow, or reproduce. Their attributes were being solid and strong, while the gemstones possessed magic. The king of gems was the diamond.

== Natural science ==
=== From Aristotle to Linnaeus ===
The basic idea of a ranking of the world's organisms goes back to Aristotle's biology. In his History of Animals, where he ranked animals over plants based on their ability to move and sense, and graded the animals by their reproductive mode, live birth being "higher" than laying cold eggs, and possession of blood, warm-blooded mammals and birds again being "higher" than "bloodless" invertebrates.

Aristotle's non-religious concept of higher and lower organisms was taken up by natural philosophers during the Scholastic period to form the basis of the Scala Naturae. The scala allowed for an ordering of beings, thus forming a basis for classification where each kind of mineral, plant and animal could be slotted into place. In medieval times, the great chain was seen as a God-given and unchangeable ordering. In the Northern Renaissance, the scientific focus shifted to biology; the threefold division of the chain below humans formed the basis for Carl Linnaeus's Systema Naturæ from 1737, where he divided the physical components of the world into the three familiar kingdoms of minerals, plants and animals.

=== In alchemy ===
Alchemy used the great chain as the basis for its cosmology. Since all beings were linked into a chain, so that there was a fundamental unity of all matter, the transformation from one place in the chain to the next might, according to alchemical reasoning, be possible. In turn, the unit of the matter enabled alchemy to make another key assumption, the philosopher's stone, which somehow gathered and concentrated the universal spirit found in all matter along the chain, and which ex hypothesi might enable the alchemical transformation of one substance to another, such as the base metal lead to the noble metal gold.

=== In evolution ===
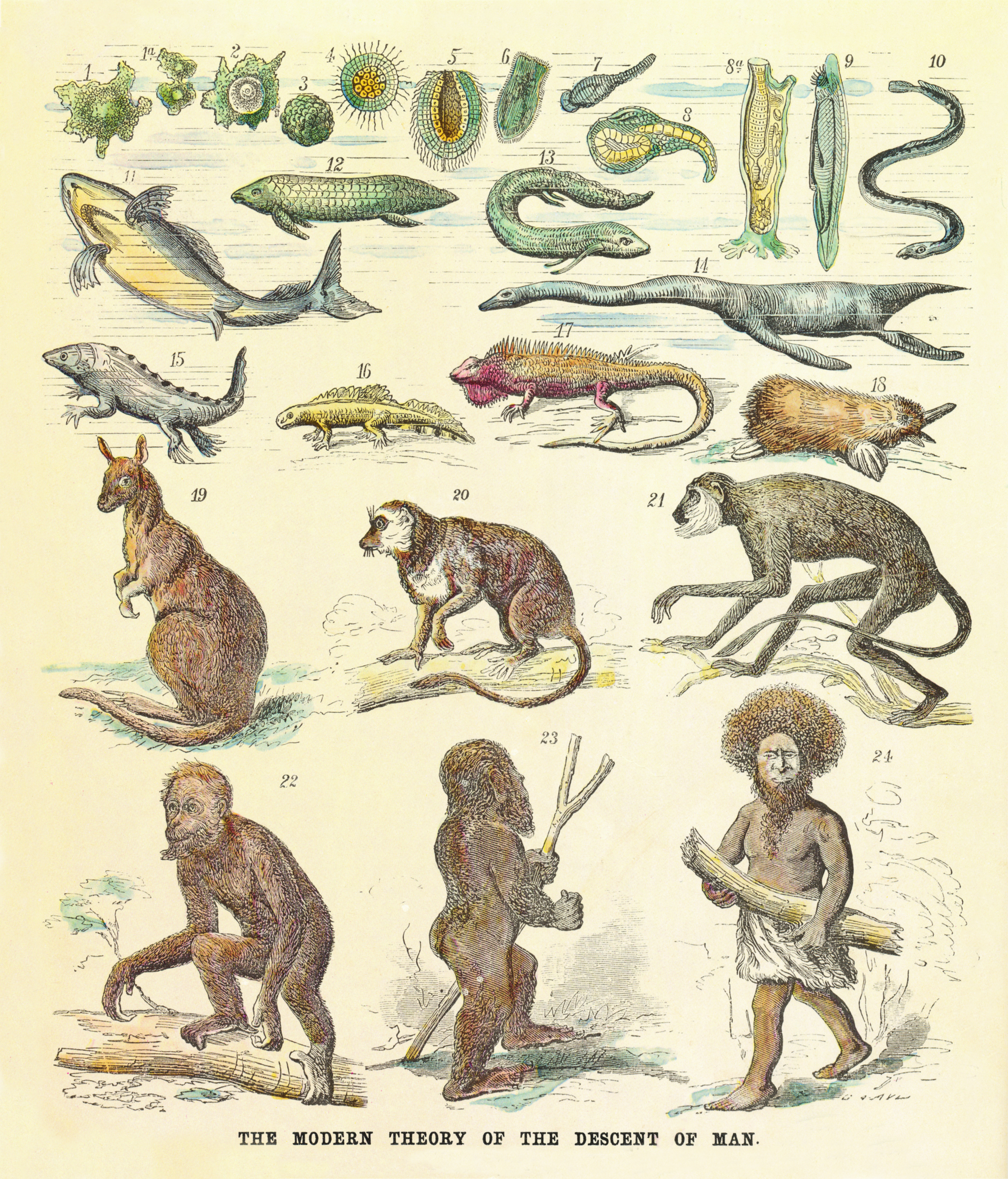
The human pedigree recapitulating its phylogeny back to amoeba shown as a reinterpreted chain of being with living and fossil animals. From a critique of Ernst Haeckel's theories, 1873.

The set nature of species, and thus the absoluteness of creatures' places in the great chain, came into question during the 18th century. The dual nature of the chain, divided yet united, had always allowed for seeing creation as essentially one continuous whole, with the potential for overlap between the links. Radical thinkers like Jean-Baptiste Lamarck saw a progression of life forms from the simplest creatures striving towards complexity and perfection, a schema accepted by zoologists like Henri de Blainville. The very idea of an ordering of organisms, even if supposedly fixed, laid the basis for the idea of transmutation of species, whether progressive goal-directed orthogenesis or Charles Darwin's undirected theory of evolution.

The chain of being continued to be part of metaphysics in 19th-century education, and the concept was well known. The geologist Charles Lyell used it as a metaphor in his 1851 Elements of Geology description of the geological column, where he used the term "missing links" about missing parts of the continuum. The term "missing link" later came to signify transitional fossils, particularly those bridging the gulf between man and beasts.

The idea of the great chain, as well as the derived "missing link", was abandoned in early 20th-century science, as the notion that embryonic development recapitulates "lower" forms was abandoned in biology, to be replaced by an evolutionary tree supplemented by horizontal gene transfer, as well as more complex web structures. The idea of a certain sequence from lower to higher complexity and fitness is still popular, as is the idea of progress in biology.

== Political implications ==
Allenby and Garreau propose that the Great Chain of Being, as developed within medieval Christian thought, helped legitimize political hierarchy and discourage rebellion for centuries. Both Catholic and later Protestant rulers appealed to this worldview. For example, the Protestant King James I himself wrote, "The state of monarchy is the most supreme thing upon earth: for kings are not only God's Lieutenants upon earth, and sit upon God's throne, but even by God himself they are called Gods."

== Adaptations and similar concepts ==
The American philosopher Ken Wilber described a "Great Nest of Being" which he claims to belong to a culture-independent "perennial philosophy" traceable across 3000 years of mystical and esoteric writings. Wilber's system corresponds with other concepts of transpersonal psychology. In his 1977 book A Guide for the Perplexed, the economist E. F. Schumacher described a hierarchy of beings, with humans at the top able mindfully to perceive the "eternal now".

== See also ==
- Figurative system of human knowledge
- History of biology
- The Ladder of Divine Ascent
- Level of organization
- Natural history
- Plane (esotericism)
- Social stratification
- Sphere of fire
- Porphyrian tree
