= Integral theory =

Framework for integrating diverse theories

Integral theory as developed by Ken Wilber is a synthetic metatheory aiming to unify a broad spectrum of Western theories and models and Eastern meditative traditions within a singular conceptual framework. The original basis, which dates to the 1970s, is the concept of a "spectrum of consciousness" that ranges from archaic consciousness to the highest form of spiritual consciousness, depicting it as an evolutionary developmental model. This model incorporates stages of development as described in structural developmental stage theories, as well as eastern meditative traditions and models of spiritual growth, and a variety of psychic and supernatural experiences.

In the advancement of his framework, Wilber introduced the AQAL (All Quadrants All Levels) model in 1995, which further expanded the theory through a four-quadrant grid (interior-exterior and individual-collective). This grid integrates theories and ideas detailing the individual's psychological and spiritual development, collective shifts in consciousness, and levels or holons in neurological functioning and societal organization. Integral theory aims to be a universal metatheory in which all academic disciplines, forms of knowledge, and experiences cohesively align.

As of 2010, integral theory had found an audience within certain subcultures, with only limited engagement from the broader academic community, though a number of dissertations have used integral theories as their theoretical foundation, in addition to ca. 150 publications on the topic. The Integral Institute published the Journal of Integral Theory and Practice, and SUNY Press has published twelve books under the "SUNY series in Integral Theory" in the early 2010s, and a number of texts applying integral theory to various topics have been released by other publishers.

== Origins and background ==
=== Origins ===
Ken Wilber's integral theory is a synthetic metatheory, a theory whose subject matter he intended to organize and integrate pre-existing theories themselves, doing so in a clear and systematic way. A synthetic metatheory "classifies whole theories according to some overarching typology." Wilber's metatheory started in the 1970s, with the publication of The Spectrum of Consciousness (1977), synthesizing Eastern religious traditions with Western schools of psychotherapy and Western developmental psychology. In The Atman Project (1980), this spectrum was presented as a developmental model, akin to western structural stage theory, models of psychology development that describe human development as following a set course of stages of development.

According to these early presentations, which rely strongly on perceived analogies between disparate theories (Sri Aurobindo's integral yoga, stage theories of psychological development, and Gebser's theory of collective mutations of consciousness), human development follows a set course, from pre-personal infant development, to personal adult development, culminating in trans-personal spiritual development. In Wilber's model, development starts with the separation of individual consciousness from a transcendental reality. The whole course of human development aims at reconnecting spirit to itself through developing a transcendental consciousness that passes through and then dis-identifies from a mature adult ego. The pre-personal and personal stages are taken from western structural stage theories, which are correlated with other stage theories. In his early work he posited four stages of properly spiritual development, going from the psychic to the subtle to the causal to the nondual (the last of which according to Wilber is not properly conceived of as a stage, but as the essence of all stages). This model has a broad resonance with many Eastern models of spiritual development, particularly those found in the Hindu and Buddhist tantric traditions. They also find rough correlations with the concepts of the great chain of being and Aurobindo's elaboration of the five sheaths or koshas in Hindu thought.

Wilber's ideas have grown more and more inclusive over the years, incorporating theories of ontology, epistemology, and methodology, creating a framework which he calls AQAL, which is shorthand for "All Quadrants All Levels All Lines All States All Types." In this, Wilber's older frameworks are primarily reworked using what Wilber calls the four quadrant model. This model divides views of reality into the individual-subjective (upper left), the individual-objective (upper right), the collective-intersubjective (lower left) and the collective-interobjective (lower right) quadrants. This model can then be used to contextualize and comprehend differing views on individual development, collective evolution of consciousness, and levels or holons of neurological functioning and societal organization more clearly, ultimately integrating them into a single metatheory in which all academic disciplines and every form of knowledge and experience are argued to fit together.

=== Main influences ===
==== Sri Aurobindo ====
Aurobindo's model of Being and Evolution
| Levels of Being | | | | | Development |
| Overall | Outer Being | | Inner Being | Psychic Being | Development |
| Supermind | Supermind | | | | Gnostic Man |
| Supermind | Supermind | | | | Supra-mentalisation |
| Mind | | Overmind | | | Psychisation and Spiritualisation |
| Mind | | Intuition | | | Psychisation and Spiritualisation |
| Mind | | Illuminated Mind | | | Psychisation and Spiritualisation |
| Mind | | Higher Mind | | | Psychisation and Spiritualisation |
| Mind | Subconscient mind | Mind proper | Subliminal (inner) mind | | Evolution |
| Vital | Subconsc. Vital | Vital | Subl. (inner); Vital | | Evolution |
| Physical | Subconsc. Physical | Physical | Subl. (inner); Physical | | Evolution |
| Inconscient | Inconscient | | | | |

The integral yoga of Sri Aurobindo describes five levels of being (physical; vital; mind or mental being; the higher reaches of mind or psychic being; Supermind), akin to the five koshas or sheaths, and three types of being (outer being, inner being, psychic being). The psychic being refers to the higher reaches of mind (higher mind, illuminated mind, intuition, overmind). It correlates with buddhi, the connecting element between purusha and prakriti in Samkhya, and correlated by Wilber with his transpersonal stages. Aurobindo focuses on spiritual development and the process of unifying of all parts of one's being with the Divine. As described by Sri Aurobindo and his co-worker The Mother (1878–1973), this spiritual teaching involves an integral divine transformation of the entire being, rather than the liberation of only a single faculty such as the intellect or the emotions or the body.

==== Structural stage theory ====
Structural stage theories are based on the observation that humans develop through a pattern of distinct stages over time, and that these stages can be described based on their distinguishing characteristics. In Piaget's theory of cognitive development, and related models like those of James Mark Baldwin, Jane Loevinger, Robert Kegan, Lawrence Kohlberg, and James W. Fowler, stages have a constant order of succession, later stages integrate the achievements of earlier stages, and each is characterized by a particular type of structure of mental processes which is specific to it. The time of appearance may vary to a certain extent depending upon environmental conditions.

==== Jean Gebser ====
The word integral was independently suggested by Jean Gebser (1905–1973), a Swiss phenomenologist and interdisciplinary scholar, in 1939 to describe his own intuition regarding the structure of human consciousness that would follow the modern or mental structure. Gebser was the author of The Ever-Present Origin, which describes human history as a series of mutations in consciousness. He only afterwards discovered the similarity between his own ideas and those of Sri Aurobindo and Teilhard de Chardin.

==== Spiral Dynamics and collaboration with Don Beck ====
Spiral Dynamics vs AQAL altitudes (Note: Note that while Visser shows two Spiral Dynamics colors above Coral, these are not present in Beck or Cowan's publications, and Cowan explicitly states that "no colors have been assigned for nodal systems beyond Turquoise and Coral. Teal and Aubergine are candidates, but Azure and Plum also have a certain appeal." (Cowan, Christopher (2006). "FAQs > Questions About the Colors in Spiral Dynamics".))
| SD / SDi | | | | AQAL altitudes (Numbers correspond to Loevinger's model | | |
| source | tier | level | | level | tier | source |
| Inspired by Graves | 2nd | Coral (unrelated and not corresponding to Wilber's 3rd tier) | | Clear Light | 3rd | Spiritual development (Aurobindo, Buddhism) |
| Inspired by Graves | 2nd | Coral (unrelated and not corresponding to Wilber's 3rd tier) | | Ultraviolet | 3rd | Spiritual development (Aurobindo, Buddhism) |
| Inspired by Graves | 2nd | Coral (unrelated and not corresponding to Wilber's 3rd tier) | | Violet | 3rd | Spiritual development (Aurobindo, Buddhism) |
| Inspired by Graves | 2nd | Coral (unrelated and not corresponding to Wilber's 3rd tier) | | Indigo | 3rd | Spiritual development (Aurobindo, Buddhism) |
| Inspired by Graves | 2nd | Turquoise | | Turquoise (5/6 Post-autonomous)) | 2nd | Structural Stage Theory |
| Inspired by Graves | 2nd | Yellow | | Teal (5 Autonomous) | 2nd | Structural Stage Theory |
| Inspired by Graves | 1st | Green | | Green (4/5 Individualistic) | 1st | Structural Stage Theory |
| Inspired by Graves | 1st | Orange | | Orange (4 Consciountious) | 1st | Structural Stage Theory |
| Inspired by Graves | 1st | - | - | Orange-Amber (3/4 self-consciousness) | 1st | Structural Stage Theory |
| Inspired by Graves | 1st | Blue | | Amber (3 Conformist) | 1st | Structural Stage Theory |
| Inspired by Graves | 1st | Red | | Red (2/3 Self-protective) | 1st | Structural Stage Theory |
| Inspired by Graves | 1st | Purple | | Magenta (2 Impulsive) | 1st | Structural Stage Theory |
| Inspired by Graves | 1st | Beige | | Infrared | | Structural Stage Theory |

After completing Sex, Ecology, Spirituality (1995), Ken Wilber started to collaborate with Don Beck, whose Spiral Dynamics is based on the work of Clare W. Graves, and which shows strong correlations with Wilber's model. Beck and Christopher Cowan had published their application and extension of Graves's work in 1996 in Spiral Dynamics: Mastering Values, Leadership, and Change. Wilber also referenced Graves's emergent cyclical levels of existence in Sex, Ecology, Spirituality, when he introduced his quadrant model, (Note: Reitter 2018 notes that Wilber treated Graves "as a respected predecessor, though typically as only one among a group of recent, relevant developmental thinkers.") and began to incorporate Spiral Dynamics in the "Integral Psychology" section of The Collected Works of Ken Wilber (Vol. 4) in 1999, and gave it a prominent place in the 2000 edition of A Theory of Everything.

Wilber and Beck put a strong emphasis on the distinctions between the 1st tier (Green and earlier) vs 2nd tier (Yellow and later) levels, associating integral thinking with the 2nd tier. They developed the concept of the "Mean Green Meme" (MGM) regarding the Green level of Spiral Dynamics, which they associated with postmodernism. Wilber further developed this idea into the "Boomeritis" concept, devoting a chapter to each in A Theory of Everything. As Beck explained:

Ken and I asked: How do we uncap GREEN? How do we keep it moving? Because so much of it has become a stagnant pond, in our view. So we said, let's invent the Mean Green Meme. Let's shame it a bit. Let's hold up a mirror and show it what it's doing, with the hope that it will separate the Mean Green Meme from legitimate healthy GREEN. Let's expose enough people to the duplicity and artificiality and self-serving nature of their own belief systems around political correctness to finally get the word out that there's something beyond that.

Cowan and his business partner Natasha Todorovic disagreed with this view, leading Todorovic to publish a paper refuting it based on psychological trait mapping research. Todorovic charged that when the Mean Green Meme concept is used to criticize a person making an argument, it "usurps arguments by undermining an individual before the debate has begun." After his collaboration with Cowan ended, Beck announced his own version of Spiral Dynamics, namely "Spiral Dynamics integral" (SDi) at the very end of 2001, while Cowan and his business partner Natasha Todorovic stayed closer to Graves' original model.

In his 2006 book Integral Spirituality, Wilber created the AQAL "altitudes" through which different lines of development move. The first eight of these "altitudes" parallel Spiral Dynamics, but the new concept was argued to create a more comprehensive, integrated system. (Note: The altitudes use a color system based on rainbow correlations with chakras, replacing the spiraling alternation of warm and cool colors that is a fundamental property in SDi with a linear progression. In place of the six-levels-per-tier structure of SDi, Wilber truncates the 2nd tier after only two levels, adding a 3rd tier of his four levels of transpersonal development, derived from the work of Sri Aurobindo and other spiritual traditions. Wilber further elaborated on this expanded and recolored system in 2017's The Religion of Tomorrow.) By 2006, Wilber and Beck had diverged in their interpretations of the Spiral Dynamics model, with Beck positioning the spiral of levels at the center of the quadrants, while Wilber placed it solely in the lower left quadrant (e.g., the collective-intersubjective quadrant that relates to a culture's interpersonal values and beliefs). Beck saw Wilber's modifications as distortions of the model, and expressed frustration with what he saw as Wilber's undue emphasis on spirituality, while Wilber declared Spiral Dynamics to be incomplete, as those who study only Spiral Dynamics "will never have a satori" (e.g., a high spiritual state experience). Beck continued to use the SDi name along with the 4Q/8L (four quadrants/eight levels) system from A Theory of Everything, while Wilber went on to criticize both Beck and Cowan.

== Wilber's metatheory ==
In Sex, Ecology, Spirituality (1995), Wilber introduced his AQAL (All Quadrants All Levels All Lines All States All Types) metatheory, a framework which consists of five fundamental concepts, sometimes called the five elements. This includes the four quadrant model, levels of development, lines of development, states of consciousness, as well as the notion of types. In this schema the four quadrant model is foundational, and the remaining four elements are then added to flesh out topics more fully. According to Wilber, the AQAL model is one of the most comprehensive approaches to reality, a metatheory in which all academic disciplines and every form of knowledge and experience fit together coherently.

"Levels" are the generalized stages of development, from pre-personal through personal to transpersonal. "Lines" are specific domains of development - akin to the concept of multiple intelligences - which may progress unevenly in a given person or a given group. That is, different lines can be, and often are, at different levels or altitudes at the same time. (Note: This interpretation is at odds with structural stage theory, which posits an overall follow-up of stages, instead of variations over several domains.) "States" are states of consciousness. According to Wilber persons (and, in a somewhat different way, cultures and collectives) may go through a wide variety of states. These can include higher spiritual states, as well as states of depression or anxiety, as well as psychologically regressive states that are holdovers from earlier stages of development. (Note: This too is at odds with structural stage theory, but in line with Wilber's philosophical idealism, which sees the phenomenal world as a concretisation, or immanation, of a "higher," transcendental reality, which can be "realized" in "religious experience.") "Types" is a category meant to describe idiosyncratic styles or emphases that one might bring to any of these other elements. For example, a certain culture might bring a particular style or emphasis to the actualization of a specific stage or state, i.e., the experience of higher spiritual states within Zen Buddhism might be colored by Japanese cultural norms, while the higher states experienced by a Hindu might be colored by the philosophy of Advaita Vedanta. Types are considered non-hierarchical and non-normative, whereas other features of Levels and Lines and States can be understood hierarchically. The individual building blocks of Wilber's model are holons, a term first introduced by the philosopher Arthur Koestler, which means that every entity and concept is both an entity on its own, and a hierarchical part of a larger whole. (Note: See Wilber 2007, "A Miracle Called 'We'" and "Excerpt A: An Integral Age at the Leading Edge". Ken Wilber Online. Shambhala Publications. 2012. Archived from the original on March 4, 2012.)

In order for an account of the Kosmos to be complete, Wilber believes that it must include each of these five categories. For Wilber, only such an account can be accurately called "integral," describing AQAL as "one suggested architecture of the Kosmos."

=== Four quadrants ===
| Upper-Left (UL) "I"; Interior Individual; Intentional e.g. Jane Loevinger and Sigmund Freud | Upper-Right (UR) "It"; Exterior Individual; Behavioral e.g. Skinner |
| Lower-Left (LL) "We"; Interior Collective; Cultural e.g. Jean Gebser and Jurgen Habermas | Lower-Right (LR) "Its"; Exterior Collective; Social e.g. Marx |

The AQAL-framework has a four-quadrant grid with two axes, specifically the "interior-exterior" axes, akin to the subjective-objective distinction, and "individual-collective" axes. The left side of the model (interior) mirrors the individual development from structural stage theory, and the collective mutations of consciousness suggested by Gebser or through the collective value memes as offered by Spiral Dynamics. The right side of the model describes, among other things, levels of neurological functioning and societal organization. Wilber uses this quadrant diagram to categorize the perspectives of various theories and scholars:

- Interior individual perspective (upper-left quadrant) describes individual psychological development, as described in structural stage theory, focusing on "I";
- Interior collective perspective (lower-left) describes collective mutations in consciousness, as in Gebser's theory, focusing on "we";
- Exterior individual perspective (upper-right) describes the physical (neurological) correlates of consciousness, from atoms through the nerve-system to the neo-cortex, focusing on observable behavior, "it";
- Exterior collective perspective (lower-right) describes the organizational levels of society (i.e. a plurality of people) as functional entities seen from outside, e.g. "they."

Each of the four approaches has a valid perspective to offer. The upper-left subjective emotional pain of a person who suffers a tragedy is one perspective; the upper-right objective neurological reaction of the brain during and after a tragedy offers an additional perspective; the lower-left way a culture understands and conceptualizes a tragedy and how to cope with it offers an additional perspective; and a lower-right analysis of how society is set up to practically respond to tragedies (i.e., through systemic interventions or reparative measures) offers yet another viewpoint. According to Wilber all are needed for real appreciation of a matter.

According to Wilber, all four perspectives offer complementary, rather than contradictory, perspectives. It is possible for all to be "correct," and all are necessary for a complete account of human existence. According to Wilber, each by itself offers only a partial view of reality. According to Wilber modern Western society has a pathological focus on the exterior or objective perspective. Such perspectives value that which can be externally measured and tested in a laboratory, but tend to deny or marginalize subjectivity, individual experience, feelings, and values (the left-hand quadrants) as unproven or having no reality. Wilber identifies this as a fundamental cause of modern society's malaise, and names the situation resulting from such perspectives "flatland".

The Integral or AQAL model places a great value on the highest stages and states. This can be referred to as nondual awareness or "the simple feeling of being," which is equated with a range of "ultimates" that are recorded and sought in a variety of Eastern and Western esoteric spiritual traditions. This nondual awareness transcends and includes the phenomenal world, which is understood to be only an emanation or manifestation of a transcendental reality. Thus, Wilber promotes a type of panentheism, which signifies that God (or spirit) is both present as the manifest universe but also transcends it. Wilber argues this is the "ultimate" truth or nature of life. According to Wilber, the AQAL categories—quadrants, lines, levels, states, and types—describe the relative truths we encounter at previous stages and states.

=== Levels or stages ===
Developmental stages
| Wilber | Wilber | Wilber (AQAL) (Numbers correspond to Loevinger's model) | Aurobindo | | | | | | Gebser | Piaget | Fowler | Age |
| Wilber | Wilber | Wilber (AQAL) (Numbers correspond to Loevinger's model) | Levels of Being | | | | | Development | Gebser | Piaget | Fowler | Age |
| Wilber | Wilber | Wilber (AQAL) (Numbers correspond to Loevinger's model) | Overall | Outer Being | | Inner Being | Psychic Being | Development | Gebser | Piaget | Fowler | Age |
| Transpersonal | Nondual | Clear Light (non-dual self) | Supermind | Supermind | | | | Gnostic Man | | | | |
| Transpersonal | Nondual | Clear Light (non-dual self) | Supermind | Supermind | | | | Supra-mentalisation | | | | |
| Transpersonal | Causal | Ultraviolet (causal self) | Mind | | Overmind | | | Psychisation and Spiritualisation | | | | |
| Transpersonal | Subtle | Violet (subtle self) | Mind | | Intuition | | | Psychisation and Spiritualisation | | | | |
| Transpersonal | Psychic | Indigo (psychic self) | Mind | | Illuminated Mind | | | Psychisation and Spiritualisation | | | | |
| Personal | Centaur (Vision-logic) | Turquoise (Integral self)(5/6) | Mind | | Higher Mind | | | Psychisation and Spiritualisation | Integral | Unitary | 6. Universalizing | 45+? |
| Personal | Centaur (Vision-logic) | Teal (Integral self)(5) | Mind | | Higher Mind | | | Psychisation and Spiritualisation | Integral | System | 5. Conjunctive | 35+? |
| Personal | Formal-reflexive | Green (4/5) | Mind | Subconscient mind | Mind proper | Subliminal (inner) mind | | Evolution | Rational | System | 4. Individual-reflexive | 21+ years? |
| Personal | Formal-reflexive | Orange (4) | Mind | Subconscient mind | Mind proper | Subliminal (inner) mind | | Evolution | Rational | Formal-operational | 4. Individual-reflexive | 21+ years? |
| Personal | Formal-reflexive | Orange/Amber (3/4) | Mind | Subconscient mind | Mind proper | Subliminal (inner) mind | | Evolution | Rational | Formal-operational | 3. Synthetic-; Conventional | 12+ years |
| Personal | Formal-reflexive | Amber (3) | Mind | Subconscient mind | Mind proper | Subliminal (inner) mind | | Evolution | Rational | Formal-operational | 3. Synthetic-; Conventional | 12+ years |
| Personal | Rule/role mind | Red (2/3) | Mind | Subconscient mind | Mind proper | Subliminal (inner) mind | | Evolution | Mythic-rational | Concrete operational | 2. Mythic-; literal | 7–12 years |
| Pre-personal | Rep-mind | Magenta (2) | Mind | Subconscient mind | Mind proper | Subliminal (inner) mind | | Evolution | Mythic | Pre-operational | 1. Intuitive-; projective | 2–7 years |
| Pre-personal | Phantasmic-emotional | Infrared (1 & 2/D) | Vital | Subconsc. Vital | Vital | Subl. (inner); Vital | | Evolution | Magical | Sensoric-motorical | 0. Undifferentiated; Faith | 0–2 years |
| Pre-personal | Sensori-physical | Infrared (1 & 2/D) | Physical | Subconsc. Physical | Physical | Subl. (inner); Physical | | Evolution | Archaic | Sensoric-motorical | 0. Undifferentiated; Faith | 0–2 years |
| Pre-personal | undifferentiated or primary matrix | | Inconscient | Inconscient | | | | | | | | |

The basis of Wilber's theory is his developmental model. Wilber's model follows the discrete structural stages of development, as described in the structural stage theories of developmental psychology, including but-not-limited to Loevinger's stages of ego development, Piaget's theory of cognitive development, Kohlberg's stages of moral development, Erikson's stages of psychosocial development, and Fowler's stages of spiritual development.

To these stages are added psychic and supernatural experiences and various models of spiritual development, presented as additional and higher stages of structural development. According to Wilber, these stages can be grouped in pre-personal (subconscious motivations), personal (conscious mental processes), and transpersonal (integrative and mystical structures) stages. All of these mental structures are considered to be complementary and legitimate, rather than mutual exclusive. Wilber's equates the levels in psychological and cultural development, with the hierarchical nature of matter itself.

=== Lines, streams, or intelligences ===
According to Wilber, various domains or lines of development, or intelligences can be discerned. They include cognitive, ethical, aesthetic, spiritual, kinesthetic, affective, musical, spatial, and logical-mathematical. For example, one can be highly developed cognitively (cerebrally smart) without being highly developed morally (as in the case of Nazi doctors).

=== States ===
States are temporary states of consciousness, such as waking, dreaming and sleeping, bodily sensations, and drug-induced and meditation-induced states. Some states are interpreted as temporary intimations of higher stages of development. Wilber's formulation is: "States are free, structures are earned". A person has to build or earn structure; it cannot be peak-experienced for free. What can be peak-experienced, however, are higher states of freedom from the stage a person is habituated to, so these deeper or higher states can be experienced at any level. (Note: In Wilber 2007, Wilber identifies a few varieties of states: The three daily cycling natural states: waking, dreaming, and sleeping.; Phenomenal states such as bodily sensations, emotions, mental ideas, memories, or inspirations, or from exterior sources such as our sensorimotor inputs, seeing, hearing, touching, smelling, tasting.; Altered states, is divided into two groups: Exogenous or induced states: psychedelic and other drug-induced states; hypnosis and hypnotherapy; psycho-therapeutic techniques; gestalt therapy; psychodrama; voice dialogue techniques; biofeedback states; forms of guided imagery; Endogenous or trained states: performance enhancement techniques in sports therapy; meditative training which work on calming, relaxation, equanimity states; and mental imaging and visualization such as tonglen meditation.; Some techniques, such as neuro-linguistic programming, work with both endogenous and exogenous types.; Spontaneous or peak states: unintentional or unexpected shifts of awareness from gross to subtle or causal states of consciousness.)

The notion of states find additional clarification in the formulation called the Wilber-Combs lattice, which argues that states are experienced and are immediately interpreted by the level or main structure of consciousness operating in the person. In this way, relatively high states can be interpreted by more or less developed and mature persons.

=== Types ===
Types are models and theories that do not fit into Wilber's other categorizations. Wilber makes types part of his model in order to point out that these distinctions are different from the already mentioned distinctions: quadrants, lines, levels and states. They are styles, emphases, or interpretations that influence a person's or a culture's perspectives, but that are non-hierarchical and non-normative. No type is in-and-of-itself better than another. Examples includes masculine/feminine typologies, the nine Enneagram categories, and Jung's psychological typologies. All types are considered potentially valid, though Wilber also argued the evidence for types is somewhat less persuasive than the four other elements of AQAL theory.

=== Holons ===
Holons are the individual building blocks of Wilber's model. Wilber borrowed the concept of holons from Arthur Koestler's description of the great chain of being, a mediaeval description of levels of being. "Holon" means that every entity and concept is both an entity on its own, and a hierarchical part of a larger whole. For example, a cell in an organism is both a whole as a cell, and at the same time a part of another whole, the organism. Likewise a letter is a self-existing entity and simultaneously an integral part of a word, which then is part of a sentence, which is part of a paragraph, which is part of a page; and so on. Everything from quarks to matter to energy to ideas can be looked at in this way. The relation between individuals and society is not the same as between cells and organisms though, because individual holons can be members but not parts of social holons.

In his book Sex, Ecology, Spirituality: The Spirit of Evolution, Wilber outlines twenty fundamental properties, called "tenets", that characterize all holons. For example, they must be able to maintain their "wholeness" and also their "part-ness;" a holon that cannot maintain its wholeness will cease to exist and will break up into its constituent parts.

Holons form natural holarchies, like Russian dolls, where a whole is a part of another whole, in turn part of another whole, and so on. Each holon can be seen from within (subjective, interior perspective) and from the outside (objective, exterior perspective), and from an individual or a collective perspective.

== Reception ==
=== Reception in mainstream academia ===
According to Frank Visser, Wilber's early work was praised by transpersonal psychologists, but support for Wilber "even in transpersonal circles" had waned by the early 1990s. In 2002 Wilber stated that he had long since stopped identifying himself with the transpersonal field, citing what he found to be deep and irreconcilable confusions in the field.

Andrew P. Smith, writing in 2004, notices that Wilber, though probably widely known, is mostly ignored and hardly criticised by "conventional scholars," likely because Wilber's work is not peer-reviewed. According to Zimmerman in 2005, integral theory is irrelevant in, and widely ignored at mainstream academic institutions, as well as sharply contested by critics. The independent scholar Frank Visser argued there is a problematic relation between Wilber and academia for several reasons, including a "self-referential discourse" wherein Wilber tends to describe his work as being at the forefront of science.

Forman and Esbjörn-Hargens responded directly in 2008 to criticisms by Frank Visser regarding the acceptance of Wilber's work in the academic world by criticizing Visser's often critical website, noting it lacks peer review, resulting in an un-academic presentation of critiques of Wilber's work. They also said that presenters at the first academic integral theory conference in 2008 had largely mainstream academic credentials, and pointed to existing programs in the alternative universities John F. Kennedy University (closed in 2020), Fielding Graduate University and CIIS as an indication of the emergence of an integral movement. Esbjörn-Hargens (2010) argued that integral theory was making inroads in the academics, both in terms of the number of academics interested in the theory as well as through its use in a number of doctoral dissertations.

=== Criticisms and responses ===
While receiving attention in publications on humanistic and transpersonal psychology in the 1980s and early 1990s, since the publication of Sex, Ecology, Spirituality in 1995 Wilber's work has mostly been discussed in alternative and non-academic fora and websites. While responding to criticisms in Ken Wilber in Dialogue (1998), Wilber has mostly ignored criticisms of his work. In 2006 Wilber created a great deal of controversy when he argued in a derisive tone that many of the critiques he received were simply ad hominem and also failed to understand his model. It was argued this essay "insulted his critics, degrading and dismissing them by basically stating that he was smarter than everybody else." (Note: Frank Visser, The Trouble With Ken Wilber)

Psychologist Kirk J. Schneider, a proponent of humanistic-existential psychology, critiqued Transpersonal Psychology and Ken Wilber in the late 1980s in the Journal of Humanistic Psychology, for its spiritually absolutist tendencies, which he argued ignore human fallibility, a critique to which Wilber was invited to respond.

In 1998 an edited volume was published by Rothberg and Kelly entitled Ken Wilber in Dialogue which compiled written, critical exchanges between Wilber and over ten of his critics. Among the critics was Michael Washburn, who previously engaged Wilber in an argument about the nature of spiritual development, with Washburn seeing it as a u-turn to the Dynamic Ground also experienced in childhood but lost in maturity, giving way to ego-transcendence, and Wilber seeing it as a novel understanding only emerging after adult development.

Psychologist Jorge Ferrer, in his 2001 publication Revisioning Transpersonal Theory, included a criticism of the AQAL model as overly hierarchical and culturally biased, arguing for a more pluralistic understanding of the world's spiritual traditions. The book received positive reviews for presenting fundamental new developments in transpersonal psychology. According to Gregg Lahood and Edward Dale it was representative for the changes in transpersonal psychology, after the initial east–west synthesis and Wilber's neo-Perennial hierarchical models. Wilber responded strongly to the criticisms in an interview, and criticized Ferrer's book in a short statement as being exemplary of the 'green mean meme', a rhetorical term (Note: Don Beck, quoted by Mathias Larsen Impossible rhetoric. Boomeritis and its rhetorical problems: "[T]he whole idea of the “Mean Green Meme” is a rhetorical strategy [...] let’s invent the Mean Green Meme: Let’s shame it a bit.") jointly coined by Wilber and Don Beck that criticizes what they saw as the tendency for post-modern (i.e., green) thinkers to be aggressive, judgmental, and implicitly hierarchical while explicitly claiming to be caring, sensitive, and non-hierarchical. Ferrer in turn rejected Wilber's criticism.

A long-standing critic of Wilber's is former fan Frank Visser, who published a biography of Ken Wilber and his work. Visser also has dedicated a website to Wilber's work, including critical essays by himself and others. (Note: Frank Visser's integralworld.net, Reading Room) and a bibliography of online criticism of Wilber's Integral Theory.

A major, specific criticism of Visser's is that Wilber misunderstands Darwinian evolutionary theory, and erroneously posits a role for "spirit" in the evolution of both subjective and objective realities. According to David C. Lane, writing in 2017, Wilber's integral theory is a religious myth build on "a deeply held theological doctrine that evolution is driven by a divine purpose." (Note: David C. Lane (2017), The Missing Nuance. The Integral Myth: Ken Wilber as Religious Preacher. A Four-Part Critique, Part Four)

== Influence ==
=== Integral movement ===
Wilber's work began to draw attention from people interested in 'integral thinking' following the completion of Sex, Ecology, Spirituality in 1995. Some individuals affiliated with Ken Wilber have said that there exists a loosely defined "Integral movement". Others, however, have disagreed. Whatever its status as a "movement", there are a variety of religious organizations, think tanks, conferences, (Note: Integral theory conferences were held in the Bay Area, California in 2008, 2010, 2013, and 2015.) workshops, and publications in the US and internationally that utilize the term integral and that explicitly refer to Wilber's definition of the term.

Steve McIntosh (2007) pointed to Henri Bergson and Teilhard de Chardin as pre-figuring Wilber as integral thinkers. Gary Hampson (2007) suggested that there are six intertwined genealogical branches of Integral, based on those who first used the term: those aligned with Aurobindo, Gebser, Wilber, Gangadean, László and Steiner (noting that the Steiner branch is via the conduit of Gidley). The editors of What Is Enlightenment? (2007) listed as contemporary Integralists Don Edward Beck, Allan Combs, Robert Godwin, Sally Goerner, George Leonard, Michael Murphy, William Irwin Thompson, and Wilber.

=== Applications and publications ===
SUNY Press published twelve books in their "SUNY series in Integral Theory" in the early 2010s. A select group of the white papers submitted for the 2008 integral conference were edited and compiled by Esbjörn-Hargens and published in 2010 in the SUNY series as Integral Theory in Action in Integral Theory,

A number of texts have sought to apply Wilber's AQAL model to psychotherapy and psychopathology. (Note: Psychotherapy applications and publications include Marquis 2008, Marquis 2018, Ingersoll & Rak 2006, Ingersoll & Zeitler 2010, Ingersoll & Marquis 2014, and Forman 2010.) The Missing Myth (2013) by Gilles Herrada utilized an Integral framework to examine the topic of same-sex love and relationships from a biological, social, and symbolic/mythic perspective.

Besides psychology and psychotherapy, Wilber's ideas have also found applicability in consultancy and management, most notably Don Beck's and Wilber's Spiral Dynamics Integral. Reinventing Organizations (2014) by Frederick Laloux examines the topic of organizational developmental from an Integral and Spiral Dynamics perspective, with a foreword by Wilber. Elza Maalouf used the AQAL-model in her corporate consulting work in the Middle East.

Michael E. Zimmerman and Sean Esbjörn-Hargens have applied Wilber's integral theory in their environmental studies and ecological research, calling it "integral ecology". Marilyn Hamilton used the term "integral city", describing the city as a living human system, using an integral lens.

=== Alternative approaches ===
Bonnitta Roy has introduced a process model of integral theory, combining Western process philosophy, Dzogchen ideas, and Wilberian theory. She distinguishes between Wilber's concept of perspective and the Dzogchen concept of view, arguing that Wilber's view is situated within a framework or structural enfoldment which constrains it, in contrast to the Dzogchen intention of being mindful of view.

Wendelin Küpers, a German scholar specializing in phenomenological research, has proposed that an "integral pheno-practice" based on aspects of the work of Maurice Merleau-Ponty can provide the basis of an "adequate phenomenology" useful in integral research. His proposed approach is intended to offer a more inclusive and coherent approach than classical phenomenology, including procedures and techniques called epoché, bracketing, reduction, and free variation.

Sean Esbjörn-Hargens has proposed a new approach to climate change called "integral pluralism", which builds on Wilber's recent work but emphasizes elements such as ontological pluralism that are understated or absent in Wilber's own writings.

Esbjörn-Hargens later expanded his interest in new approaches to meta-theorizing into engagements with French complexity theorist Edgar Morin as well as philosophy-of-science writer Roy Bhaskar. A multi-year exchange took place at multiple symposia between a group of integral theorists and a group versed in Bhaskar's Critical Realism, which included Bhaskar himself. The details of the meetings and its participants are recounted in a joint publication Metatheory for the Twenty-First Century (2015), which "examines the points of connection and divergence between critical realism and integral theory." P. Marshall's A Complex Integral Realist Perspective (2016), applying the "integrative metatheories" of Morin, Wilber and Baskar to "[outline] a ‘new axial vision’ for the twenty-first century," was also "informed, broadened and deepened" by these conferences.

== See also ==
- Douglas Harding - Youniverse Explorer
- Eight-circuit model of consciousness
- Interdisciplinarity
- List of New Age topics
- Metamodernism
- Neuro-linguistic programming
- Post-postmodernism
- Scale (analytical tool)
- Systems science
- Transdisciplinarity
- Transmodernism
