= Developmental stage theories =

Stages of human child development

In psychology, developmental stage theories are theories that divide psychological development into distinct stages which are characterized by qualitative differences in behavior.

Several views exist on psychological and physical development and how they progress throughout the lifespan. The two main psychological developmental theories include continuous and discontinuous development. In addition to individual differences in development, developmental psychologists generally agree that development occurs in an orderly way and in different areas simultaneously.

== Stage theories ==
The development of the human mind is complex and debated, and may occur in a continuous or discontinuous fashion. Continuous development, like the height of a child, is measurable and quantitative, while discontinuous development is qualitative, like hair or skin color, where those traits fall only under a few specific phenotypes. Continuous development involves gradual and ongoing changes throughout the life span, with behavior in the earlier stages of development providing the basis of skills and abilities required for the next stages. On the other hand, discontinuous development involves distinct and separate stages, with different kinds of behavior occurring in each stage.

Stage theories of development rest on the assumption that development is a discontinuous process involving distinct stages which are characterized by qualitative differences in behavior. They also assume that the structure of the stage is not variable according to each individual; however the time of each stage may vary individually. While some theories focus primarily on the healthy development of children, others propose stages that are characterized by a maturity rarely reached before old age.

=== Ego-psychology ===
The psychosexual stage theory created by Sigmund Freud (b.1856) consists of five distinct stages of Psychosexual development that individuals will pass through for the duration of their lifespan. Four of these stages span from birth through puberty, and the final stage continues through the rest of life. Erik Erikson (b.1902) developed a psychosocial developmental theory, which was both influenced by and built upon Freud's work, and includes four childhood and four adult stages of life that capture the essence of personality during each period of development. Each of Erikson's stages includes both positive and negative influences that can go on to be seen later in an individual's life. His theory includes the influence of biological factors on development. Jane Loevinger (b.1918) built on the work of Erikson in her description of stages of ego development.

=== Individuation and attachment in ego-psychology ===
Margaret Mahler's (b.1897) theory of separation-individuation in child development contains three phases regarding the child's object relations. John Bowlby's (b.1907) attachment theory proposes that developmental needs and attachment in children are connected to particular people, places, and objects throughout our lives. These connections provide a behavior in the young child that is heavily affected and relied on throughout the entire lifespan. In the case of maternal deprivation, this development may be disturbed. Robert Kegan (b.1946) provided a theory of the evolving self, which describes the constructive development theory of subject–object relations.

=== Cognitive and moral development ===
==== Cognitive development ====
===== Piaget's cognitive development theory =====
Jean Piaget's cognitive developmental theory describes four major stages from birth through puberty, the last of which starts at 12 years and has no terminating age: Sensorimotor: (birth to 2 years), Preoperations: (2 to 7 years), Concrete operations: (7 to 11 years), and Formal Operations: (from 12 years). Each stage has at least two substages, usually called early and fully. Piaget's theory is a structural stage theory, which implies that:

- Each stage is qualitatively different; it is a change in nature, not just quantity;
- Each stage lays the foundation for the next;
- Everyone goes through the stages in the same order.

===== Neo-Piagetian theories =====
Neo-Piagetian theories criticize and build on Piaget's work. Juan Pascaual-Leone was the first to propose a neo-Piagetian stage theory. Since that time several neo-Piagetian theories of cognitive development have been proposed. These include the theories of Robbie Case, Grame Halford, Andreas Demetriou and Kurt W. Fischer. The theory of Michael Commons' model of hierarchical complexity is also relevant. The description of stages in these theories is more elaborate and focuses on underlying mechanisms of information processing rather than on reasoning as such. In fact, development in information processing capacity is invoked to explain the development of reasoning. More stages are described (as many as 15), with 4 added beyond the stage of Formal operations. Most stage sequences map onto one another. Post-Piagetian stages are free of content and context and are therefore very general.

===== Other related theories =====
Lawrence Kohlberg (b.1927) in his stages of moral development described how individuals developed moral reasoning. Kohlberg agreed with Piaget's theory of moral development that moral understanding is linked to cognitive development. His three levels were categorized as: preconventional, conventional, and postconventional, all of which have two sub-stages. James W. Fowler (b.1940) and his stages of faith development theory build off of both Piaget's and Kohlberg's schemes.

=== Learning and education ===
Maria Montessori (b.1871) described a number of stages in her educational philosophy. Albert Bandura (b.1925), in his social learning theory, emphasizes the child's experiential learning from the environment.

=== Spirituality and consultancy ===
Inspired by Theosophy, Rudolf Steiner (b.1861) had developed a stage theory based on seven-year life phases. Three childhood phases (conception to 21 years) are followed by three stages of development of the ego (21–42 years), concluding with three stages of spiritual development (42-63). The theory is applied in Waldorf education

Clare W. Graves (b.1914) developed an emergent cyclical levels of existence theory. It was popularized by Don Beck (b.1937) and Chris Cowan's as spiral dynamics, and mainly applied in consultancy. Ken Wilber (b.1949) integrated Spiral Dynamics in his integral theory, which also includes psychological stages of development as described by Jean Piaget and Jane Loevinger, the spiritual models of Sri Aurobindo and Rudolf Steiner, and Jean Gebsers theory of mutations of consciousness in human history.

=== Other theories ===
Lev Vygotsky (b.1896) developed several theories, particularly zone of proximal development. Other theories are not exactly developmental stage theories, but do incorporate a hierarchy of psychological factors and elements. Abraham Maslow (b.1908) described a hierarchy of needs. James Marcia (b.1937) developed a theory of identity achievement and identity status.
