= Andrew Cohen (spiritual teacher) =

American spiritual teacher (1955–2025)

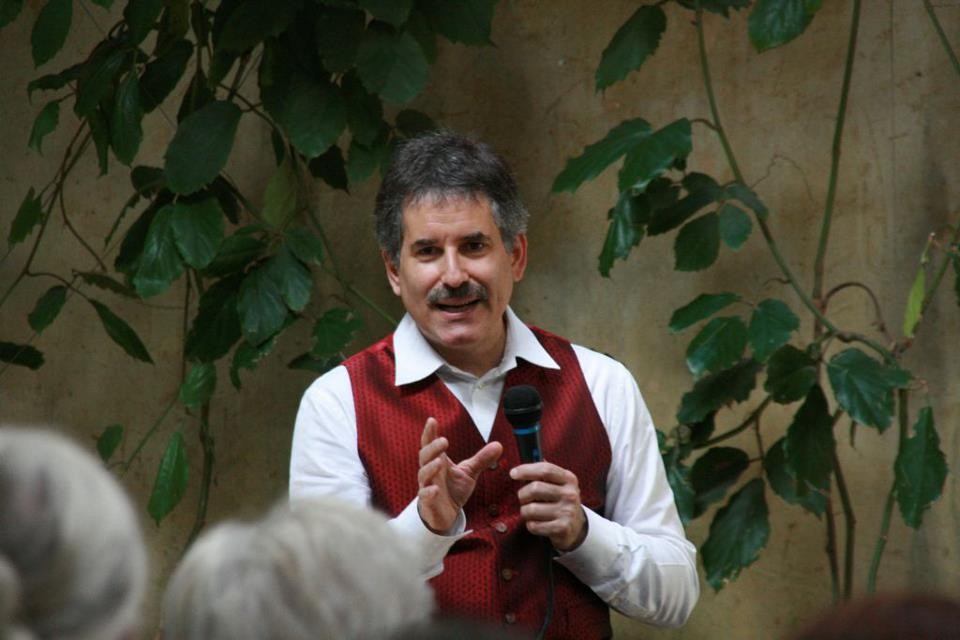
- Cohen teaching in Paris, 2012
- Born: October 23, 1955; New York City, U.S.
- Died: March 25, 2025 (aged 69); Tiruvannamalai, Tamil Nadu, India
- Occupations: Spiritual teacher, author, musician

Andrew Cohen (October 23, 1955 – March 25, 2025) was an American controversial self-declared spiritual teacher, who was accused by former students, including his mother, of mental, physical, and financial abuse.

== Biography and beliefs ==
Cohen was born in New York City on October 23, 1955 into an upper-middle class secular Jewish family. Cohen recounts that his life was changed by a spontaneous experience of "cosmic consciousness" at the age of 16. At 22 years of age, and after pursuing a career as a jazz musician, he began a full-time quest to recover his earlier spiritual experience, enabled by "financial resources, derived from a significant inheritance." (Note: Chrisopher Titmuss, Andrew Cohen. An Obituary.) Being encouraged to go there by a friend of his in Tiruvannamalai, he met H. W. L. Poonja in 1986, a teacher inspired by Ramana Maharshi, who taught that no mind effort is needed to attain enlightenment "because it is merely the realisation of what one already has". At their first meeting, Cohen realized that he "had always been free".

He claimed that Poonja declared him his heir, and in 1986 Cohen began to teach as a neo-Advaita teacher, founding EnlightenNext (initially named the Impersonal Enlightenment Fellowship and Moksha Foundation), (Note: andrewcohen.com, EnlightenNext 1986-2013) and gathering a community around him, starting with students from Christopher Titmuss who followed him to the USA. However Cohen only spent a short time in the presence of H. W. L. Poonja, who later claimed never to have given Cohen permission to give spiritual teachings, despite his initial flattering statements, which he issued at a regular base to many visitors.

Within a few years, Cohen considered that the ecstatic experiences his students had in his presence were not resulting in lasting transformation. Being convinced that he himself was fully free from karmic bondage, he began to demand more commitment from his students, insisting on complete "ego-transcendence." This change in teaching style led to a break with Poonja, whom Cohen felt had ethical and enlightened behavioral shortcomings. (Note: According to Cohen, "Poonja insisted that the realization of the Self had nothing to do with worldly behavior, and he did not believe fully transcending the ego was possible." According to Poonja, "Karmic tendencies remained after enlightenment, [but] the enlightened person was no longer identified with them and, therefore, did not accrue further karmic consequences." For Poonja, ethical standards were based on an understanding of duality and the notion of an individual agent, and were therefore not representative of Advaita: "For Poonja, the goal was the realisation of the self; the illusory realm of relative reality was ultimately irrelevant." Cohen did not agree, insisting instead on "flawless behavior" as the expression of enlightenment.) After the break with Poonja, Cohen's teachings were further developed into "Evolutionary Enlightenment," aiming at an impersonal enlightenment which transcends personal awakening.

In 1991, Cohen founded EnlightenNext magazine (under its original title, What Is Enlightenment?), which "established him as a major contemporary spiritual figure." In 2004, EnlightenNext magazine partnered with the Graduate Institute in Connecticut to offer a master's program in Conscious Evolution. From 2004 to 2007, Cohen served as a core faculty of that institute. (Note: The Graduate Institute, Catalog of Program, Conscious Evolution Program, 2004–07) The magazine ceased publication in 2011.

In 2001, Cohen co-formed the jazz-funk-fusion band Unfulfilled Desires, in which he played drums. The band played original compositions and standards, and performed in Europe and the United States. They released four CDs: Live at the Iron Horse (2002), Enlightened Dog (2004), Punk Funk (2008), and Plugged (2010).

The change in teaching-style led to "physical force, verbal abuse, and intense psychological pressure against students." The growing complaints from students have been described in several publications from former students and from his own mother. On June 26, 2013, Cohen announced on his blog that he would be taking "a sabbatical for an extended period of time," after confrontational exchanges with some of his closest students, who helped Cohen to realize, as he put it, that "in spite of the depth of my awakening, my ego is still alive and well". (Note: According to Steve Taylor, "the mistake [...] Andrew Cohen [makes is that he] confuse[s] the revelations and insights of temporary awakening experiences with a state of permanent wakefullness.")

On May 12, 2015, Cohen posted an apology letter to his former students on his blog, his first writing after emerging from a two-year sabbatical. In it, he wrote about the need to embrace the spiritual principle of agape, as well as eros, and expressed regret for the ways in which his lack of the former in his teaching methods hurt and alienated many former students.

In September 2016, after over three years' absence from public life, Cohen unveiled a redesigned website. This included an announcement of his intention to return to formal teaching, beginning with a retreat planned for early 2017.

In 2020, Cohen launched Manifest Nirvana, an online meditation and teaching platform that is described on the homepage as a "Home for Sovereign Souls, Radical Spirits and Integral Pioneers."

Cohen died in Tiruvannamalai, Tamil Nadu, India on March 25, 2025, at the age of 69. (Note: Manifest Nirvana, Dear friends)

== Teachings ==
=== Influences ===
When beginning to teach, Cohen was influenced by H. W. L. Poonja, who offered a "deinstitutionalized and experiential Advaita," comparable to Ramana Maharshi's teachings, which differ from the traditional Advaita Vedanta of Shankara. He likewise credited the "integral philosopher" Ken Wilber, with whom he conducted frequent public discourses, with helping him form the theoretical framework of his teachings. (Note: They call their public dialogues “The Guru and the Pandit.” Cohen was a Founding Member of Integral Spirituality, which is part of Wilber's Integral Institute. Cohen's last book, Evolutionary Enlightenment, was dedicated to Wilber.) He was also influenced by the Spiral Dynamics theories put forward by Don Beck as an extension of the emergent cyclical theory of Clare Graves. Cohen was also inspired by Swami Krishnananda of the Divine Life Society in India, and his call "In unity there is strength; come together, come together."

=== Evolutionary Enlightenment ===
According to Cohen, "traditional" enlightenment is the realisation of the transcendental aspect of God, and it often goes hand in hand with the realization that the world is an illusion.

Cohen said that he had discovered a different form of "enlightened awareness," which he claimed to be unique. He first called this "impersonal enlightenment" to reflect the fact that it was a realization shared between people rather than an individual attainment. He later changed the name to Evolutionary Enlightenment, both to reflect his belief that it indicates the next stage of the evolution of enlightenment and to convey the creative, world-embracing vision of spiritual awakening as an unending process of individual and cultural development.

A fundamental aspect of Cohen's Evolutionary Enlightenment is the distinction between what he saw as two fundamental, yet opposing, aspects of the human psyche: the "ego" and the "authentic self", In his teaching, ego is defined as "the deeply ingrained, compulsive need to remain separate and superior at all times, in all places, under all circumstances." The authentic self, on the other hand, is defined as "the urge to become more conscious".

According to Cohen and Wilber, "enlightenment" does not refer to an unchanging state, but has to be in accord with an ongoing evolution of humanity, which is the "Authentic Self." According to Cohen, individuals need to recognize that their own spiritual transformation is essential for cultural evolution. To achieve that, in Cohen's view, an individual should strive to realize his or her true self as being "one with the timeless Ground of all Being and with the evolutionary impulse that is driving the entire cosmos."

According to Wilber, evolutionary enlightenment means "the realization of oneness with all states and all stages that have evolved so far and that are in existence at any given time." Cohen believed that individuals needed to transcend egoism to express the "Authentic Self." Through identifying the evolutionary impulse as their own Authentic Self, individuals could transcend ego, and find a deeper self-sense without relying on asceticism or solitude.

Cohen's ideas were co-inspired by Wilber's Integral Theory, offering an integral vision of the integral evolution of matter and consciousness. According to this theory, human development parallels the evolution of all being.

== Controversies ==
The mental, physical, and financial abuse Cohen perpetrated against former students, which he justifies as "crazy wisdom", are documented in books such as American Guru, Enlightenment Blues, and Mother of God, as well as popular blogs such as What Enlightenment? and EnlightenNixt.

H. W. L. Poonja, also known as Papaji, the Indian guru who Cohen claimed called him his "heir", stated publicly that Cohen only spent 25 hours in satsang before proclaiming himself as enlightened. Papaji describes Cohen's claims as the arrogance of his ego and never acknowledged Cohen as a master or heir, but rather described him as a messenger.

Poonja himself has been sharply criticized for too easily authorising students to teach:

One of the tragedies of Poonjaji's teaching ministry is that he either told, inferred, or allowed hundreds of individuals to believe they were fully enlightened simply because they'd had one, or many, powerful experiences of awakening. These "enlightened" teachers then proceeded to enlighten their own students in a similar way, and thus was born what is known as the "neo-Advaita", or "satsang" movement in western culture.

Some of Cohen's former followers, including his mother, Luna Tarlo, have viewed him as a manipulative spiritual teacher. Tarlo wrote a critical book, called Mother of God, about her experience as one of his disciples. In a Psychology Today article published in 1998, entitled "Crimes of the Soul", Tarlo recounted how she became a disciple of her son who told her "to give way to him or their relationship would end" and forbade her "to express an opinion on anything". Tarlo said she "knew if I seriously objected to anything, I'd be kicked out" and stated that her son, formerly the "sweetest, sensitive kid, had changed into an unrecognizable tyrant".

André van der Braak's Enlightenment Blues: My Years with an American Guru alleges that Cohen demanded large sums of money and extreme and unquestioning devotion from his students.

American Guru: A Story of Love, Betrayal and Healing, by William Yenner and other former Cohen student contributors (foreword by Stephen Batchelor), allege authoritarianism, financial manipulation, physical, and psychological abuse in Cohen's community, and discusses the challenges of healing after leaving the community.

According to Christopher Titmuss, Cohen was haunted by "the idealism, perfectionism and pressures [...] that an enlightened life should be a state of perfection", commenting that "It seems that Andrew expected the same level of unconditional dedication from his students as he had shown to Poonja, until the disillusionment set in. The statements of LOVE, LOVE, LOVE in capital letters found in the book from Andrew to Poonja did not seem to get past the hurdle."

Over the years, there were many indications that Cohen's group was in difficult financial straits. In 2011 it officially ended publication of its magazine EnlightenNext; according to Christopher Titmuss, "A mountain of debt, the rise of social, spiritual websites and online teachings outdated the publication." In the summer of 2013, Cohen was accused of being a cult leader. As of early 2014, the EnlightenNext organization's main building on its property in Lenox, Massachusetts, which had been on the market for years, remained up for sale.

In 2016, over 240 of Cohen's former students signed an online petition titled "Stop Andrew Cohen teaching again", including detailed explanations of why they believe him to be unfit to teach others.

== Works ==
Cohen wrote for The Huffington Post, Big Think, and Speaking Tree. (Note: Cohen, Andrew. "Search | SpeakingTree". Speakingtree.in.)

=== Bibliography ===
- My Master Is My Self (1989), ISBN 1-883929-07-5
- Enlightenment Is a Secret (1991), ISBN 1-883929-08-3
- Autobiography of An Awakening (1992), ISBN 0-9622678-4-8
- An Unconditional Relationship to Life (1995), ISBN 1-883929-04-0
- The Challenge of Enlightenment (1996), ISBN 1-883929-14-8
- In Defense of the Guru Principle (1999), ISBN 1-883929-27-X
- Freedom Has No History (1997), ISBN 1-883929-17-2
- Who Am I? and How Shall I Live? (1998), ISBN 1-883929-24-5
- Embracing Heaven & Earth (2000), ISBN 1-883929-29-6
- Living Enlightenment: A Call for Evolution Beyond Ego (2002), ISBN 1-883929-30-X
- Evolutionary Enlightenment: A New Path to Spiritual Awakening (2011), ISBN 1-59079-209-2
- When Shadow Meets the Bodhisattva (2023), ISBN 1-64411-590-5

== See also ==
- Integral theory (Ken Wilber)

== Sources ==
=== Printed sources ===
Primary

- Braak, Andre van der (2003), Enlightenment Blues: My Years with an American Guru, Monkfish Book Publishing Company
- Caplan, Mariana (2009), Eyes Wide Open: Cultivating Discernment on the Spiritual Path, Sounds True
- Cohen, Andrew (2011), Evolutionary Enlightenment: A New Path to Spiritual Awakening, New York, NY: Select books
- Sand, Marlowe (2015), Paradise and Promises: Chronicles of My Life with a Self-Declared, Modern-Day Buddha, O-Books
- Tarlo, Luna (2009), The Mother of God, Monkfish Book Publishing Company
- Wilber, Ken (2007a), Integral Spirituality, Integral Books
- Wilber, Ken (2007b), The Integral Vision, Shambala Publications, Inc.
- Yenner, William (2009), American Guru: A Story of Love, Betrayal and Healing-former students of Andrew Cohen speak out, Monkfish Book Publishing Company

Secondary

- Gleig, Ann (November 2013), Gleig, Ann; Williamson, Lola (eds.), Homegrown Gurus: From Hinduism in America to American Hinduism, SUNY Press, 246 pages, archived from the original on June 13, 2015
