= Loevinger's stages of ego development =

Psychological model

Loevinger's stages of ego development are proposed by developmental psychologist Jane Loevinger (1918–2008) and conceptualize a theory based on Erik Erikson's psychosocial model and the works of Harry Stack Sullivan (1892–1949) in which "the ego was theorized to mature and evolve through stages across the lifespan as a result of a dynamic interaction between the inner self and the outer environment". Loevinger's theory contributes to the delineation of ego development, which goes beyond the fragmentation of trait psychology and looks at personality as a meaningful whole.

== Development ==
Loevinger conceived of an ego-development system which closely resembles moral development, but is broader in scope and uses empirical methods of study. She created an objective test of mothers' attitudes to problems in family life, which Loevinger called the Family Problems Scale. Although this first test did not yield the expected results, she noted a strong similarity between authoritarian family ideology and the authoritarian personality concept being developed at UC Berkeley in the early 1960s. Loevinger noticed that the women who were at the extreme ends of the authoritarian scale also tended to be the most immature. These women tended to agree with such statements as "[a] mother should be her daughter's best friend", at the same time endorsing punitive behavior. She also observed that a liberal, non-authoritarian personality was not the opposite of a high authoritarian personality; anomie (a disorganized and detached social style) was the opposite of high authoritarianism, indicating a curvilinear relationship.

Loevinger theorized that this was because the Authoritarian Family Ideology scale measured just authoritarianism, but a broader concept which affected the other constructs she measured. By combining this theoretical framework with Sullivan and Grant's interpersonal-maturity continuum, she created the concept of ego development. Loevinger then developed the Washington University Sentence Completion Test, the primary method of determining ego development on her scale.

== Stages ==
Loevinger describes the ego as a process, rather than a thing; it is the frame of reference (or lens) one uses to construct and interpret one's world. This contains impulse control and character development with interpersonal relations and cognitive preoccupations, including self-concept. Sullivan (1958) proposed four levels of "interpersonal maturity and interpersonal integration": impulsive, conformist, conscientious, and autonomous. Developing from that initial framework, Loevinger completed a developmental model of nine sequential stages, each representing a progressively more-complex way of perceiving oneself in relation to the world. Every stage provides a frame of reference to organize and define experience over an individual's life: "Since each new ego stage or frame of reference builds on the previous one and integrates it, no one can skip a stage ... One has not yet acquired the interpersonal logic."

As the adult ego develops, Loevinger considered the emergence of a sense of self-awareness in which one becomes aware of discrepancies between conventions and one's behavior. For some, development reaches a plateau and does not continue; for others, greater ego integration and differentiation continue. Loevinger proposed eight or nine stages of ego in development, six of which occur in adulthood: conformist, conscientious-conformist, conscientious, individualistic, autonomous, and integrated. She believed that most adults were at the conscientious-conformist level.

=== Pre-Social (E1) ===
The baby, which is at the mercy of the world around it (and its own needs), really has no ego to speak of until it begins to differentiate itself from its caregivers and the demands of the outer environment.

=== Impulsive (E2) ===
The child "asserts his growing sense of self", and views the world in egocentric terms; "the child is preoccupied with bodily impulses, particularly (age-appropriate) sexual and aggressive ones." Immersed in the moment, they view the world solely in terms of how things affect him or her. Impulses affirm a sense of self, but are "curbed by the environment." When someone meets the child's needs, they are considered "good"; if they do not meet his or her needs, they are considered "bad" (often resulting in impulsive retaliation, such as running away or running home). Discipline is viewed by the child as restraint; rewards and punishments are seen as "nice to me" or "mean to me". The child's "needs and feelings are experienced mostly in bodily modes," and "the child's orientation at this stage is almost exclusively to the present rather than to past or future."

=== Self-Protective (E3) ===
The self-protective stage is "the first step towards self-control of impulses. The Self-Protective person has the notion of blame, but he externalizes it to other people or to circumstances." At this level, the child "craves a morally prescribed, rigidly enforced, unchanging order"; if maintained too long, "an older child or adult who remains here may become opportunistic, deceptive, and preoccupied with control ... naive instrumental hedonism". Although a degree of conceptual cohesion has been reached, morality is essentially a matter of anticipating rewards and punishments (with the motto "Don't Get Caught").

=== Conformist (E4) ===
"Most children around school age ... progress to the next stage, conformity." Individuals begin to view themselves and others as conforming to socially-approved codes or norms. Loevinger describes this stage as having "the greatest cognitive simplicity. There is a right way and a wrong way and it is the same for everyone ... or broad classes of people". One example of groups conforming at this age is by gender: boys and girls; individuals are invested in belonging to, and obtaining the approval of, groups. Behaviour is judged externally, not by intentions, and this concept of "belonging to the group (family or peers) is most valued." "The child starts to identify his welfare with that of the group"; for the stage "to be consolidated, there must be a strong element of trust." An ability to understand rules of the group appears; a group member's disapproval becomes a sanction, in addition to the fear of punishment. Rules and norms, however, are not yet distinguished. "While the Conformist likes and trusts other people within his own group, he may define that group narrowly and reject any or all outgroups, and stereotypes roles on the principle of social desirability: people are what they ought to be."

=== Self-Aware (E5) ===
Loevinger considered the Self-Aware (also known as Conscientious-Conformist) stage the "model for adults in our society," and thought that few passed the stage before at least age twenty-five. The stage has two characteristics; "An increase in self-awareness and the capacity to imagine multiple possibilities in situations ... [was] a stable position in mature life, one marked by the development of 'rudimentary self-awareness and self-criticism'". "However, the closeness of the self to norms and expectations reveal[s] the transitional nature of these conceptions, midway between the group stereotypes of the Conformist and the appreciation for individual differences at higher levels." She believed that the level produces a "deepened interest in interpersonal relations."

=== Conscientious (E6) ===
At "the conscientious stage ... individuals at this level, and even more often at higher levels, refer spontaneously to psychological development." Internalization of rules is complete by this stage, although "exceptions and contingencies are recognized." Goals and ideals are acknowledged, and there is a new sense of responsibility; guilt is triggered by hurting another, rather than by breaking rules. "The tendency to look at things in a broader social context" is offset by a self seen as apart from the group, but from another's point of view; as a result, "descriptions of people are more realistic ... [with] more complexities." Standards are self-chosen, and are distinguished from manners; people are seen in terms of their motives, not just their actions. A conscientious person "sees life as presenting choices; s/he holds the origin of his own destiny ... aspires to achievement, ad astra per aspera".

=== Individualistic (E7) ===
During this stage, persons demonstrate a respect for individuality and interpersonal ties. According to Loevinger, "To proceed beyond the Conscientious Stage, a person must become more tolerant of himself and of others ... out of the recognition of individual differences and of complexities of circumstances". The individualistic ego has a broad-minded tolerance of, and respect for, the autonomy of oneself and others. With a new distancing from role identities, "moralism begins to be replaced by an awareness of inner conflict" and the new stage is "marked by a heightened sense of individuality and a concern for emotional dependence." Subjective experience is opposed to objective reality, inner reality to outward appearance: "vivid and personal versions of ideas presented as cliches at lower levels". A growing concern for psychological causality and development goes hand-in-hand with "greater complexity in conceptions of interpersonal interaction."

=== Autonomous (E8) ===
Loevinger described this stage as the "freeing of the person from oppressive demands of conscience in the preceding stage." People at this stage are "synthesizers", able to conceptually integrate ideas. The autonomous person "recognizes the limitations to autonomy, that emotional interdependence is inevitable", and may experience a "confrontation with the limitations of abilities and roles as part of deepening self-acceptance."

"Self-fulfillment becomes a frequent goal, partly supplanting achievement", and there may be a greater "capacity to acknowledge and to cope with inner conflicts" (such as that between needs and duties). "A high toleration for ambiguity ... [and] conceptual complexity" (the capacity to embrace polarity, complexity and multiple facets, and to integrate ideas) and "respect for other people's need for autonomy in clear terms" are other features of the autonomous stage.

=== Integrated (E9) ===
According to Loevinger, this stage is rarely attained. At the integrated stage, "learning is understood as unavoidable ... the unattainable is renounced." The ego exhibits wisdom, broad empathy towards oneself and others, and a capacity to be aware of inner conflicts (like the individualistic ego) or to tolerate them (like the autonomous ego) and make peace with them. "Reconciling inner conflicts ... [and the] cherishing of individuality" are key elements of self-actualization, along with a formed identity which includes "reconciliation to one's destiny."

=== Possible Tenth Stage: Flowing (E10) ===
As differentiation increases, the model of ego development has found broader acceptance among international researchers. Therefore, a new stage E10 — identified as "Flowing" (i.e., "Fließende") — has been mentioned in the context of "Ich-Entwicklung" (i.e., "Ego Development"), the German equivalent of Loevinger's stages.

== Critical response ==
Susanne Cook-Greuter has refined Loevinger's sentence-completion test instrument and her definitions and distinctions among the stages of ego development, and has explored the relationship between the highest stages and ego transcendence. Terri O'Fallon also researches states and stages of ego development with her own theory.

According to Drew Westen, Loevinger's model suffers from a lack of clinical grounding, and "like Kohlberg's theory ... it confuses content and structure." Based on the assessment of verbalized material, "the measure focuses so heavily on conscious verbal responses, it does not discriminate intelligent, liberal people with severe ego defects from those who actually are quite integrated."

However, the extent of her research adds weight to her findings. "Loevinger's (1976) model of development is derived entirely from empirical research using her sentence completion test [...] The manuals contain hundreds of actual completions, organized by exemplary categories."

For a long time, Loevinger's research was not well known within the German-speaking community. In 2016, Binder published a detailed compilation in Germany on the current state of discussion, which also parallels the stages found by Loevinger with those of Kegan. In the meantime, the system is more frequently cited and used in coaching and organizational development practice and reflection in the German-speaking world, often comparing and combining Loevinger's findings with other approaches to personality development.

== See also ==
- Piaget's theory of cognitive development
- Erik Erikson
- Erikson's stages of psychosocial development
- James W. Fowler
- Lawrence Kohlberg
- Lawrence Kohlberg's stages of moral development
- Robert Kegan
- Clare W. Graves
- Graves's emergent cyclical levels of existence
- Don Edward Beck
- Spiral Dynamics
- Ken Wilber
- Integral theory (Ken Wilber)
- Pierre Janet

== Sources ==
- Aging, The Individual, and Society, 8th edition, by Susan M. Hillier and Georgia M. Barrow.
