= Conscious evolution =

Hypothetical ability of the human species to choose what they will become

The concept of conscious evolution refers to the theoretical ability of human beings to become conscious participants in the evolution of their cultures, or even of the entirety of human society, based on a relatively recent combination of factors, including increasing awareness of cultural and social patterns, reaction against perceived problems with existing patterns, injustices, inequities, and other factors.

The idea of conscious evolution is not a specific theory, but it has loose connections to integral theory, metamodernism, General Evolutionary Theory (also known as Evolutionary Systems Theory), Spiral Dynamics, and noosphere thought. Barbara Marx Hubbard also connects the idea with that of the global brain; Julie A. Yusupova associates conscious evolution with collective consciousness. Some have suggested "conscious cultural-evolution" as a more accurate term, to reduce association with standard biological evolution, though this is not widely applied.

== Mechanism ==
At the centre of the concept of conscious evolution are the approximate definitions of the term's constituent phenomena ('consciousness' and 'evolution'). However, the term implies more than these phenomena generally encompass, not least as it is often used with strong assumptions of a collective interest/ common good.

Evolution does not exclusively act upon morphological (phenotypic) variation; it can also work on a cognitive level. Daniel Dennett has suggested that evolution is simply a process which uses natural selection as a basic algorithm for progression. This could be applied to changes in behaviours, practices, concepts, theories and ideas (cultural evolution). In these situations the mutating replicators of evolution can be considered memes (theoretical units of cultural information) rather than genes. Over the last 10,000 years humanity has become increasingly capable of influencing its own environment and cognitively adapting to these environmental changes through the use of evolving memes. Memetic (cognitive) innovation (as opposed to morphological variation) has therefore become the primary driver of humanity's evolutionary success.

Humans are ‘conscious’, and are consciously manipulating the memes they use. Consciousness itself (in humans’ brains) can therefore be said to have agency over its own evolution, because memetic usage influences evolutionary success. Evolution is also something humans are conscious of. Consciousness (in human brains) can therefore be simultaneously conscious of evolution (working in this case upon memes) while consciously manipulating its own memetics, in order to influence its own evolution. Evolution (in the sense of its impact upon memetics) is therefore increasingly a subject of knowledge, rather than an unknown pressure operating on the world.

== Opinions ==
The concept of conscious evolution is sometimes associated with certain luminaries’ personal evolutionary journeys. The central objective is to achieve a globally sustainable future by developing the idea that humans can guide evolution, now that we are conscious of it (evolutionary consciousness). Owing to the broad definition of the term, numerous writers and thinkers, from a range of fields and backgrounds have contributed ideas to the concept of conscious evolution. These include; Erich Jantsch, Teilhard de Chardin, Jonas Salk, Ervin Laszlo, Mihaly Csikszentmihaly, Bela H. Banathy, Barbara Marx Hubbard, Andrew Cohen, David Bohm, Eric Chaisson, Duane Elgin, Brian Swimme, Ken Wilber, Jorge Taborga, Robert Cobbold, Alexander Zelitchenko and others.

One of the earliest uses of the phrase 'conscious evolution' may be that of Mary Parker Follett in 1918: "Conscious evolution means giving less and less place to herd instinct and more to the group imperative. We are emerging from our gregarious condition and are now to enter on the rational way of living by scanning our relations to one another, instead of bluntly feeling them, and so adjusting them that unimpeded progress on this higher plane is secured." (The New State, p. 91)

Human evolution, has thus far been the consequence of billions of random events and chance interactions (as opposed to a planned endeavour). Given that humans have knowledge of this evolutionary process (evolutionary consciousness) it is the task of humanity to take control of these random changes, to avoid the 'disastrous fate' (extinction) that has befallen the majority of species that have ever existed. This idea that evolutionary consciousness should be used as a tool, or even an argument for self-guided evolution, is a major central theme of the concept of conscious evolution. Bela H. Banathy captures this sentiment succinctly in his paper Self guided/conscious evolution: “Our consciousness of evolution becomes a springboard for leaping into conscious evolution.” The issue then arises of how humanity can be expected to know how it should use its recently acquired evolutionary consciousness to select the best evolutionary path. Jonas Salks is optimistic that humanity is capable of merging intuition with reason in order to find the path that leads to conscious evolution: “It now remains for human beings to decide the ultimate course of human evolution. By imagining ourselves inside the process of evolution and by imagining the process of evolution working inside our minds, we may discover how to deal with the opportunities that might influence the direction of evolutionary choices.”

Co-intelligence; a form of group intelligence that incorporates group wisdom for the benefit of humanity, is a concept Tom Atlee has stressed as an essential foundation for conscious evolution. Atlee suggested that many of the factors of co-intelligence (wisdom, intentionality, choice, awareness) could be used as tools to enhance consciousness and improve shared circumstances. Eric Chaisson similarly identified ‘knowledge’ and ‘compassion’ as key guiding forces for the future, stating in 1987 that we must “act wisely, quite beyond intelligently, in order to achieve successful ethical evolution”. Chaisson's main emphasis, however, was on ethics, which he argued was the most important focus for ensuring effective conscious evolution: “if our species is to survive to enjoy the future, then we must make synonymous the words ‘future’ and ‘ethical,’ thus terming our next evolutionary epoch ‘ethical evolution’”.

Numerous aspects of both co-intelligence and ethics, in our self-guided, conscious evolution are also present in the writings of Barbara Marx Hubbard, one of the most widely published advocates of conscious evolution. Hubbard has a positive opinion of humanity and the evolutionary process. She has claimed that: “Every tendency in us leads us toward greater wholeness, unity, and connectedness... Integration is inherent in the process of evolution.” However, Hubbard has been criticised for focusing on the most hopeful evidence that conscious evolution is taking humanity in a positive direction. In an otherwise positive review of her 1998 book Conscious Evolution; Awakening the Power of Our Social Potential, Scott London commented that much of the evidence provided was “soft” and “anecdotal”.
