= Neo-Advaita =

Religious movement

Neo-Advaita, also called the Satsang-movement, is a new religious movement, emphasizing the direct recognition of the non-existence of the "I" or "ego," without the need of preparatory practice. Its teachings are derived from, but not authorised by, the teachings of the 20th century sage Ramana Maharshi, (Note: David Frawley, Misconceptions about Advaita. The Mountain Path, Sri Ramanashram) as interpreted and popularized by H. W. L. Poonja and several of his western students.

It is part of a larger religious current called immediatism by Arthur Versluis, which has its roots in both western and eastern spirituality. Western influences are western esoteric traditions like Transcendentalism, and "New Age millennialism, self-empowerment and self-therapy".

Neo-Advaita makes little use of the "traditional language or cultural frames of Advaita Vedanta", and some have criticised it for its lack of preparatory training, (Note: Alan Jacobs: "What Neo-Advaita presents is the seductive formula that 'there is nothing you can do or need to do, all you have to know is that there is no one there.'",) and regard enlightenment-experiences induced by Neo-Advaita as superficial. (Note: Frawley: "[I]nstead of looking into the background and full scope of Ramana’s teachings, there is often only a focus only on those of his teachings that seem to promise quick realization for all.")

== Teachings ==
The basic practice of neo-Advaita is self-inquiry, via the question "Who am I?", or simply the direct recognition of the non-existence of the "I" or "ego." This recognition is taken to be equal to the Advaita Vedanta recognition of the identity of Atman and Brahman, or the recognition of the "Formless Self." According to neo-Advaitins, no preparatory practice is necessary, nor prolonged study of religious scriptures or tradition: insight alone suffices. (Note: Jeff Foster, The birth and death of fundamentalism in non-duality and Advaita teachings.) (Note: Spiritualteachers.org (Author unknown), "Neo-Advaita Demystified") (Note: Timothy Conway, Neo-Advaita or Pseudo-Advaita and Real Advaita-Nonduality)

Poonja, who is credited as one of the main instigators of the neo-Advaita movement, saw this realization as in itself liberating from karmic consequences and further rebirth. According to Poonja "karmic tendencies remained after enlightenment, [but] the enlightened person was no longer identified with them and, therefore, did not accrue further karmic consequences." According to Cohen, Poonja "insisted that the realization of the Self had nothing to do with worldly behavior, and he did not believe fully transcending the ego was possible." For Poonja, ethical standards were based on a dualistic understanding of duality and the notion of an individual agent, and therefore were not indicative of "non-dual enlightenment: "For Poonja, the goal was the realization of the self; the illusory realm of relative reality was ultimately irrelevant."

== History ==
According to Lucas and Frawley, the spiritual root of neo-Advaita is Ramana Maharshi, whose teachings, and method of self-inquiry could easily be transposed to North America’s liberal spiritual subculture. Popular interest in Indian religions goes as far back as the early 19th century, and was stimulated by the American Transcendentalists and the Theosophical Society. In the 1930s Ramana Maharshi's teachings were brought to the west by Paul Brunton, a Theosophist, in his A Search in Secret India. Stimulated by Arthur Osborne, in the 1960s Bhagawat Singh actively started to spread Ramana Maharshi's teachings in the USA.

Since the 1970s western interest in Asian religions has seen a rapid growth. Ramana Maharshi's teachings have been further popularized in the west via H. W. L. Poonja and his students. Poonja, better known as Papaji, "told, inferred, or allowed hundreds of individuals to believe they were fully enlightened simply because they'd had one, or many, powerful experiences of awakening." It was those students who initiated the "neo-Advaita", or "satsang" movement, which has become an important constituent of popular western spirituality. It is being spread by websites and publishing enterprises, which give an easy access to its teachings.

== The "Ramana effect" ==
Lucas has called the popularisation of Ramana Maharshi's teachings in the west "the Ramana effect". According to Lucas, Ramana Maharshi was the greatest modern proponent of Advaita Vedanta, well known for emphasizing the enquiry of the question "Who am I?" as a means to attain awakening. According to Lucas, following Thomas Csordas, the success of this movement is due to a "portable practice" and a "transposable message". Ramana Maharshi's main practice, self-inquiry via the question "Who am I?", is easily practiceable in a non-institutionalized context. His visitors and devotees did not have to adopt the Vedantic culture, nor to commit themselves to an institution or ideology, to be able to practice self-inquiry. Ramana's teachings are transposable into a western context. Ramana Maharshi himself did not demand a shift in religious affiliation, and was himself acquainted with western religions, using quotes from the Bible. Neo-Advaita teachers have further deemphasized the traditional language and worldframe of Advaita, using a modern, psychologized worldframe to present their teachings as a form of self-help, which is easily accessible to a larger audience.

== Western discourses ==
The western approach to "Asian enlightenment traditions" is highly eclectic, drawing on various Asian traditions, as well as "numerous Western discourses such as psychology, science, and politics." Neo-Advaita uses western discourses, such as "New Age millennialism, Zen, self-empowerment and self-therapy" to transmit its teachings. It makes little use of the "traditional language or cultural frames of Advaita Vedanta," and is framed in a western construction of experiential and perennial mysticism, "to the disregard of its social, ethical and political aspects." This "modern experiential and perennialist mystical framework" emphasizes Perennialism, the idea that there is a common, mystical core to all religions, which can be empirically validated by personal experience. It has pervaded the western understanding of Asian religions, and can be found in Swami Vivekananda and Sarvepalli Radhakrishnan's Neo-Vedanta, but also in the works of D.T. Suzuki and his "decontextualized and experiential account" of Zen Buddhism. It can also be found in the Theosophical Society, and the contemporary New Age culture, with influences like Aldous Huxley's The Perennial Philosophy and The Doors of Perception, and writers like Ken Wilber. (Note: See also Sharf's "Buddhist Modernism and the Rhetoric of Meditative Experience".)

Gregg Lahood also mentions Neo-Advaita as an ingredient of "cosmological hybridization, a process in which spiritual paradises are bound together", as exemplified in American Transcendentalism, New Age, transpersonal psychology and the works of Ken Wilber are examples: Brown and Leledaki place this "hybridization" in a "structurationist" approach, pointing out that this is an "invented tradition", which is a response to a novel situation, although it claims a continuity with a "historic past", which is "largely facticious." Brown and Leledaki see these newly emerging traditions as part of western Orientalism, the fascination of western cultures with eastern cultures, but also the reduction of "Asian societies, its people, practices and cultures to essentialist images of the 'other'". Brown and Leledaki also note that this Orientalism is not a one-way affair, but that "there has been a dynamic interaction between Asian and Western representatives of various religious traditions over the last 150 years," and that this "blending of thought and practice" is a co-creation from modernist religious movements in both East and West. (Note: See also the influence of the Theosophical Society on Theravada Buddhism and the Vipassana movement, and the influence of the Theosophical Society and western modernism on Buddhist modernism, especially D. T. Suzuki.)

According to Arthur Versluis, neo-Advaita is part of a larger religious current which he calls immediatism, "the assertion of immediate spiritual illumination without much if any preparatory practice within a particular religious tradition." Its origins predate American Transcendentalism. In American Gurus: From Transcendentalism to New Age Religion, Versluis describes the emergence of immediatist gurus: gurus who are not connected to any of the traditional religions, and promise instant enlightenment and liberation. These include Eckhart Tolle, and Andrew Cohen. "Immediatism" refers to "a religious assertion of spontaneous, direct, unmediated spiritual insight into reality (typically with little or no prior training), which some term 'enlightenment'." According to Versluis, immediatism is typical for Americans, who want "the fruit of religion, but not its obligations." Although immediatism has its roots in European culture and history as far back as Platonism, and also includes Perennialism, Versluis points to Ralph Waldo Emerson as its key ancestor, who "emphasized the possibility of immediate, direct spiritual knowledge and power."

== Criticism ==
Neo-Advaita has been called a "controversial movement," (Note: Timothy Conway, Nondual Spirituality or Mystical Advaita) and has been criticized, (Note: Lucas: ... serious critiques leveled at Neo-Advaitins by more traditional Advaitins in India and North America. Disputes over the authenticity of a transposed tradition are a commonplace in the history of missionization and the spread of traditions across cultures.) for its emphasis on insight alone, omitting the preparatory practices. (Note: James Swartz, What is Neo-Advaita?) (Note: David Frawley: "The teachings of Ramana Maharshi are often the starting point for neo-Advaitic teachers, though other influences also exist in the movement. However, instead of looking into the background and full scope of Ramana’s teachings, there is often only a focus only on those of his teachings that seem to promise quick realization for all.") It has also been criticised for its references to a "lineage" of Ramana Maharshi, whereas Ramana never claimed to have disciples and never appointed any successors. (Note: John David, An Introduction to Sri Ramana's Life and Teachings. David Godman talks to John David. Page 6) (Note: arunachala-ramana.org, Bhagavan Sri Ramana Maharshi – Great Sage or Milch cow?)

=== Insight and practice ===
==== Insight alone is not enough ====
Some critics say that seeing through the 'illusion of ego' is the main point of neo-Advaita, and that this does not suffice. (Note: "Traditional Advaita says that the ego is an illusion. The ‘Satsang Prophets’ emphasize this as THE starting point, completely omitting that this realization may only occur at the end of years of self-inquiry and work on oneself (and not necessarily with any certainty). Once this premise is understood and the self-cheating is engaged, one obtains a constant very pleasant feeling of superiority and invulnerability. This is what they regard as being the ultimate accomplishment.") According to Caplan, the enlightenment-experiences induced by these teachers and their satsangs are considered to be superficial.

==== Practice is necessary ====
According to Dennis Waite, neo-Advaita claims to remove ignorance, but does not offer help to remove ignorance. (Note: Non-Duality Magazine, Dennis Waite. Interview with Non-Duality Magazine) According to Caplan, traditional Advaita Vedanta takes years of practice, which is quite different from the neo-Advaita claims. Classical Advaita Vedanta uses the "fourfold discipline" (sādhana-catustaya) to train students and attain moksha. Years of committed practice is needed to sever or destroy the "occlusion" the so-called "vasanas, samskaras, bodily sheaths and vrittis", and the "granthi (Note: See The Knot of the Heart) or knot forming identification between Self and mind," and prepare the mind for the insight into non-duality. (Note: Swartz: "Traditional Vedanta completely [...] insists that a person be discriminating, dispassionate, calm of mind, and endowed with a ‘burning’ desire for liberation along with other secondary qualifications like devotion, faith, perseverance and so on. In other words it requires a mature adult with a one-pointed desire to know the Self.") After awakening, "post awakening sadhana," or post-satori practice is necessary: "all of the great ones had a post awakening sadhana, including Ramana Maharishi, who spent many years sitting alone in Samadhi before he ever accepted his first student." (Note: Ed Muzika, Edward Muzika, Awakening versus Liberation) (Note: Jacobs: "The main Neo-Advaita fallacy ignores the fact that there is an occlusion or veiling formed by vasanas, samskaras, bodily sheaths and vrittis, and there is a granthi or knot forming identification between Self and mind, which has to be severed [...] The Maharshi's remedy to this whole trap is persistent effective Self-enquiry, and/or complete unconditional surrender of the 'phantom ego' to Self or God, until the granthi is severed, the vasanas are rendered harmless like a burned out rope. Ramana Maharshi:"Therefore, leaving the corpse-like body as an actual corpse and remaining without even uttering the word 'I' by mouth, if one now keenly enquires, 'What is it that rises as "I"?’ then in the Heart a certain soundless sphurana, 'I-I', will shine forth of its own accord. It is an awareness that is single and undivided, the thoughts which are many and divided having disappeared. If one remains still without leaving it, even the sphurana – having completely annihilated the sense of the individuality, the form of the ego, 'I am the body' – will itself in the end subside, just like the flame that catches the camphor. This alone is said to be liberation by great ones and scriptures. (The Mountain Path, 1982, p. 98)." (Note: David Godman (23 June 2008), More on Bhagavan's death experience)) After realization, further practice is necessary 'to ripen the fruit', as stated by Nisargadatya Maharaj: "the fruit falls suddenly, but the ripening takes time." Ed Muzika refers to Nisargadatta Maharaj, stating

He met his teacher in 1933 and had his awakening in 1936. He then traveled as a wandering monk for two years visiting many shrines, temples, and teachers across India, until he recognized there was no difference in his beingness no matter where he was. So he returned home to his wife and business in 1938. Apparently he spend many years discussing all aspects of consciousness and the absolute with another disciple of his teacher, wherein they both worked out the concepts he put forward in the book “I Am That.” He did not accept students for another 13 years, in 1951. You see, he was still maturing, learning, changing, even though he already had a firm grasp on the absolute.

=== Lineage ===
Western critics object to the perceived relation between Ramana Maharshi and Neo-Advaita, (Note: James Swartz: "Then in the Eighties the Western spiritual world became reacquainted with Ramana Maharshi [...] The rediscovery of Ramana roughly coincided with the rise of ‘Neo-Advaita.’ Neo-Advaita is basically a ‘satsang’ based ‘movement’ that has very little in common with either traditional Vedanta or modern Vedanta or even its inspiration, Ramana [...] except the doctrine of non-duality.") noting that Ramana never promoted any lineage, (Note: "There have been many senior devotees of Bhagavan who, in their own right, had both the ability and authority to teach in his name. Muruganar, Sadhu Natanananda and Kunju Swami are some of those who immediately spring to mind. None of them to my knowledge ever claimed pre-eminence and the prerogative to teach. They knew two things. One, there would be many who would bow to their superior knowledge and set them up as an independent source, but secondly, they also knew that to abrogate for themselves the privilege would run contrary to Bhagavan’s mission or purpose.") did not publicize himself as a guru, never claimed to have disciples, and never appointed any successors. (Note: "In actuality each of us is privy to his knowledge and blessing without any intermediary if we are open and receptive to the teachings. Each of us legitimately can claim lineage from Bhagavan although he himself was not part of any succession but stood alone, and in that sense of linear continuity he neither received nor gave initiation. But that is not the point, because though we each have the right to receive his grace, it is entirely different when it comes to assuming authority to disseminate the teachings. It is here we need to be very clear and separate the claims of wannabe gurus from the genuine devotees who are grateful recipients of grace.") Despite this, there are numerous contemporary teachers who assert, suggest, or are said by others, to be in his lineage. (Note: Advaita Vision, Disciples of Ramana Maharshi) (Note: Rob Sacks, An Interview with David Godman. By Rob Sacks for Realization.org. Page 2) (Note: Most of them are connected with Ramana Maharshi via H. W. L. Poonja, who has been criticised for too easily sending students out to "teach". See, for examples, Andrew Cohen, Gangaji, (Note: Gangaji.orgg, The Lineage) Other examples are Sri Lakshmana and Mathru Sri Sarada.) (Note: The reference by those teachers to Ramana fits into Berger's notion of legitimacy, which is part of the plausibility structure, the socio-cultural context in which a set of beliefs and assumptions is accepted as "real" (see . Ramana's "lineage" lends legitimacy to the position and teachings of those teachers.) These assertions have been disputed by other teachers, stating that there is no lineage from Ramana Maharshi. (Note: Timothy Conway: "...there's NO LINEAGE FROM MAHARSHI and most of these figures are NOT fully enlightened or liberated in any really meaningful sense of the term.) Critics have also noted that Ramana and like-minded teachers like Nisargadatta Maharaj did not charge fees or donations.

== See also ==
- Hinduism in the West
- Sociological classifications of religious movements
- Spiritual bypassing

== Sources ==
=== Printed sources ===
- Berger, Peter L. (1990), The Sacred Canopy. Elements of a Sociological Theory of Religion, New York: Anchor Books
- Brown, David; Leledaki, Aspasia (2010), Eastern Movement Forms as Body-Self Transforming Cultural Practices in the West: Towards a Sociological Perspective. In: Cultural Sociology March 2010 vol. 4 no. 1 123-154
- Caplan, Mariana (2009), Eyes Wide Open: Cultivating Discernment on the Spiritual Path, Sounds True
- Davis, Leesa S. (2010), Advaita Vedānta and Zen Buddhism: Deconstructive Modes of Spiritual Inquiry, Continuum International Publishing Group
- Forsthoefel, Thomas A. (2005), The Perennial Appeal of Ramana Maharshi. In: Thomas A. Forsthoefel, Cynthia Ann Humes (2005), Gurus In America, SUNY Press
- Gleig, Ann Louise (2011), Enlightenment After the Enlightenment: American Transformations of Asian Contemplative Traditions, RICE UNIVERSITY, ProQuest 885589248
- Gleig, Ann (2013), Gleig, Ann; Williamson, Lola (eds.), From Being to Becoming, Transforming to Transcending. Andrew Cohen and the Evolution of Enlightenment, SUNY Press
- Gombrich, Richard F. (1996), Theravada Buddhism. A Social History from Ancient Benares to Modern Colombo, London and New York: Routledge
- Jacobs, Alan (Autumn 2004), "Advaita and Western Neo-Advaita", The Mountain Path Journal, Ramanasramam: 81–88, archived from the original on 2015-05-18
- Lahood, Gregg (2010), "Relational Spirituality, Part 1" (PDF), International Journal of Transpersonal Studies, 29 (1)
- Lucas, Phillip Charles (November 2011), "When a Movement Is Not a Movement. Ramana Maharshi and Neo-Advaita in North America", Nova Religio: The Journal of Alternative and Emergent Religions, 15 (2): 93–114, doi:10.1525/nr.2011.15.2.93, JSTOR 10.1525/nr.2011.15.2.93
- Lucas, Phillip Charles (2014), "Non-Traditional Modern Advaita Gurus in the West and Their Traditional Modern Advaita Critics", Nova Religio: The Journal of Alternative and Emergent Religions, 17 (3): 6–37, doi:10.1525/nr.2014.17.3.6
- Maharaj, Nisargadatta (1987), I Am That, The Acorn Press, ISBN 085655-406-5
- Marek, David (2008), Dualität - Nondualität. Konzeptuelles und nichtkonzeptuelles Erkennen in Psychologie und buddhistischer Praxis (PDF)
- McMahan, David L. (2008), The Making of Buddhist Modernism, Oxford University Press, ISBN 9780195183276
- Michaelson, Jay (2009), Everything Is God: The Radical Path of Nondual Judaism, Shambhala
- Puligandla, Ramakrishna (1997), Fundamentals of Indian Philosophy, New Delhi: D.K. Printworld (P) Ltd.
- Renard, Philip (2010), Non-Dualisme. De directe bevrijdingsweg, Cothen: Uitgeverij Juwelenschip
- Sharf, Robert H. (1995), "Buddhist Modernism and the Rhetoric of Meditative Experience" (PDF), NUMEN, 42 (3): 228–283, doi:10.1163/1568527952598549, hdl:2027.42/43810, archived from the original (PDF) on 2019-04-12
- Sinari, Ramakant (2000), Advaita and Contemporary Indian Philosophy. In: Chattopadhyana (gen.ed.), "History of Science, Philosophy and Culture in Indian Civilization. Volume II Part 2: Advaita Vedanta", Delhi: Centre for Studies in Civilizations
- Swartz, James (2008), How to Attain Enlightenment: The Vision of Non-Duality, Sentient Publications
- Versluis, Arthur (2014), American Gurus: From American Transcendentalism to New Age Religion, Oxford University Press
- Yogani (2011), Advanced Yoga Practices Support Forum Posts of Yogani, 2005-2010, AYP Publishing
