= Gangaji =

American spiritual teacher and writer (born 1942)

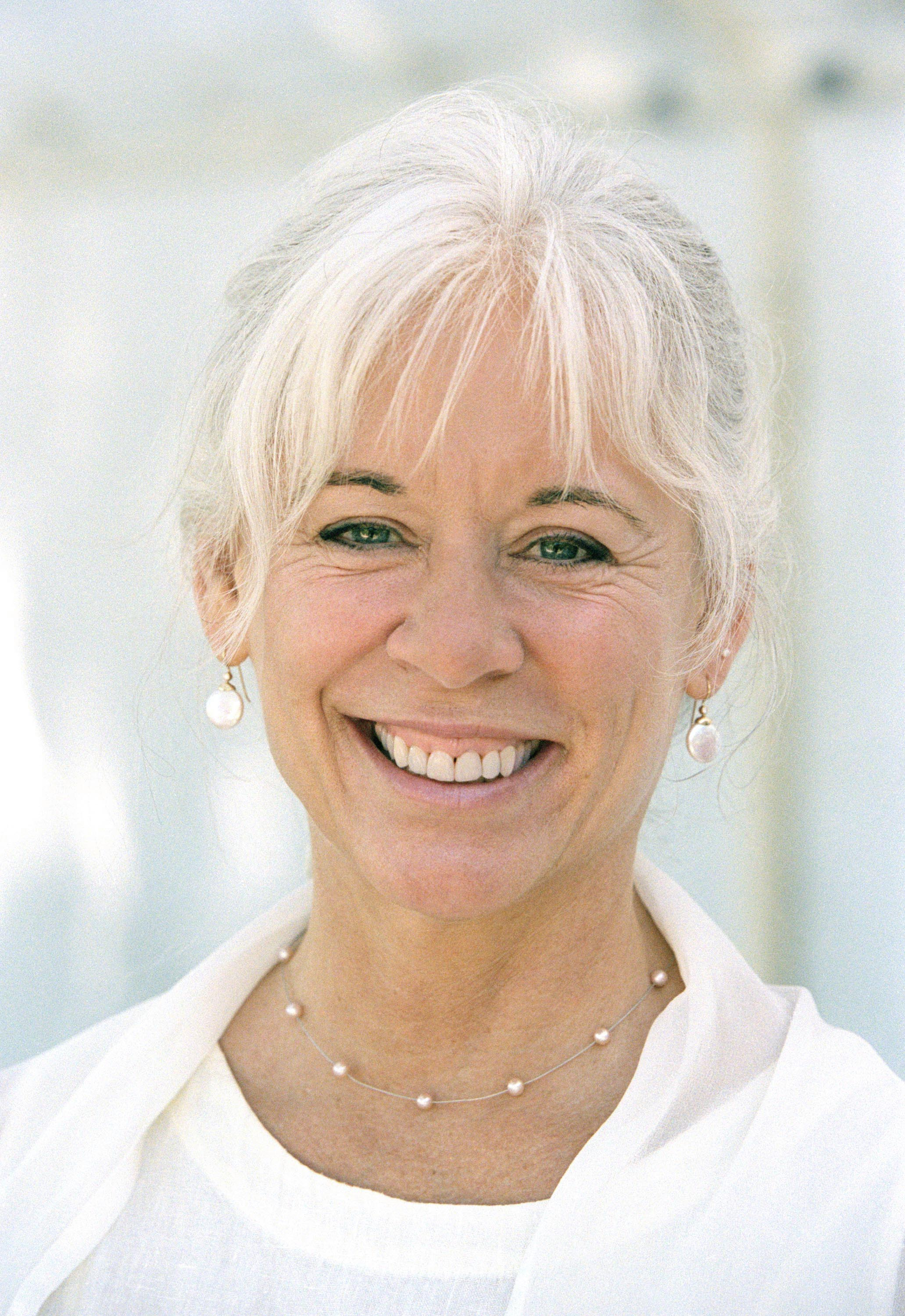
- Born: Merle Antoinette Roberson; 1942 (age 83–84); Texas, U.S.
- Education: University of Mississippi
- Occupation: Spiritual writer

Gangaji (/ˈɡɑːŋɡədʒi/ GAHNG-gə-jee; born Merle Antoinette Roberson in Texas, 1942) is an American Neo-Advaita spiritual teacher and writer.

== Early life ==
Gangaji was born Merle Antoinette Roberson in Texas in 1942, and grew up in Mississippi.

After graduating from the University of Mississippi, she married her first husband and had a child, then became a teacher in Memphis, Tennessee. The couple moved to California in 1972 and later divorced. Gangaji became interested in spirituality, then met and married her second husband, Eli Jaxon-Bear. For a time, the two operated a Tibetan Buddhism Dharma center overseen by Kalu Rinpoche. In 1990, Gangaji and Jaxon-Bear went to India, where she met H. W. L. Poonja, better known as Papaji. Afterwards, Gangaji devoted herself to holding satsang when she returned to the West.

== Teachings ==
Gangaji holds satsang, which is strongly influenced by Ramana Maharshi and Papaji. She started the Gangaji Foundation, which sponsors live events and publishes her books and other media.

A video of Gangaji teaching about peace was used in the video game The Witness.

== Personal life ==
In October 2005, Gangaji and husband Eli Jaxon-Bear separated after he admitted to a three-year affair with an adult female student. The two reunited three months later and subsequently merged their foundations.

== Bibliography ==
=== Books ===
- You are That!. Satsang Press. 1995. ISBN 0-9632194-3-X.
- Freedom and Resolve. Gangaji Foundation. 1999. ISBN 1-887984-01-1.
- (with Roslyn Moore) Just Like You. DO Publishing. 2003. ISBN 0-9646999-2-3.
- The Diamond in Your Pocket: Discovering Your True Radiance. Sounds True. 2007. ISBN 978-1-59179-272-7.
- Hidden Treasure: Uncovering the Truth in Your Life Story. Penguin Publishing Group. 2011. ISBN 978-1-58542-887-8.
- Freedom and Resolve, Finding Your True Home in the Universe. Hampton Roads Publishing. 2014. ISBN 978-1571747211.

=== Chapters ===
- Robinson, Rita, ed. (2007). Ordinary Women, Extraordinary Wisdom: The Feminine Face of Awakening. O Books. pp. 209–231. ISBN 978-1-84694-068-2.
- Shapiro, Ed; Shapiro, Deb, eds. (2009). Be the Change: How Meditation Can Transform You and the World. Sterling Ethos. ISBN 978-1-4027-6001-3.
