= Samuel Isaac Weissman =

American chemist (1912–2007)

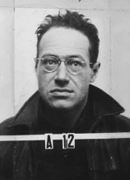
- Born: June 25, 1912; South Bend, Indiana, U.S.
- Died: June 12, 2007 (aged 94); St. Louis, Missouri, U.S.
- Education: University of Chicago
- Spouse: Jane Loevinger Weissman
- Scientific career
- Fields: Nuclear chemistry
- Workplaces: Washington University in St. Louis

Samuel Isaac Weissman (/ˈwaɪsmən/; June 25, 1912 – June 12, 2007) was an American chemist and professor best known for his work on the application of electron spin resonance (ESR) to chemistry.

== Biography ==
Weissman was born in South Bend, Indiana in 1912. He completed a chemistry degree at the University of Chicago in 1933 and his doctorate from the same university in 1938.

Weissman was working on a project on fluorescent energy transfer, which later led to some rare-earth lasers, at the University of California, Berkeley when he was asked to join the Manhattan Project developing atomic weapons in 1943. He was among a group who asked unsuccessfully that the bomb not be dropped on civilian targets.

After his Los Alamos stint, Weissman went to the Washington University in St. Louis in 1946 becoming a full professor in 1955. At Washington University, Weissman worked with others developing the use of electron spin resonance. He was one of the first, probably in parallel with Clyde Hutchison, to measure the hyperfine splitting of the ESR line caused by the interaction with nuclear spins. This hyperfine splitting is the main source of the sensitivity of ESR to the chemical environment of the electron, and hence it underlies the broad applications of ESR in chemistry. Much of his work concerned the way this interaction term behaves as molecules tumble around in solution or undergo chemical reactions. He also investigated the special non-equilibrium ESR effects which are found as reactions take place.

Weissman was a member of the United States National Academy of Sciences. Weissman retired from Washington University in 1980 and died in June 2007. He was married to a distinguished psychologist, Jane Loevinger.
