= The Speaking Tree =

Indian weekly newspaper

- Type: Weekly newspaper
- Owner: The Times of India
- Publisher: Bennett Coleman & Co. Ltd.
- Language: English and Hindi
- City: Mumbai, Delhi, Ahmedabad, Bangalore and Calcutta
- Country: India
- Circulation: 3,18,000
- RNI: MAHENG12413
- Website: timesofindia.indiatimes.com/speaking-tree

The Speaking Tree is an Indian weekly newspaper which is published by Bennett Coleman & Co. Ltd. It is one of the highest−circulation weekly newspapers in India, with a circulation of 315,000 (2014) and 318,000 (2016). It is circulated in Mumbai, Delhi, Ahmedabad, Bangalore and Calcutta. In Mumbai, 204,067 newspapers are circulated. According to Comscore, the website has 8 million pageviews. It is available in Hindi as well as English. It is a spiritual network intended to allow spiritual seekers to link with established practitioners.
