= Social pattern =

Social pattern may refer to:

- Social behavior, behavior in which one member of a species affects others
- Social structure, patterned social arrangements in society
