= Don Edward Beck =

American psychologist (1937–2022)

Don E. Beck
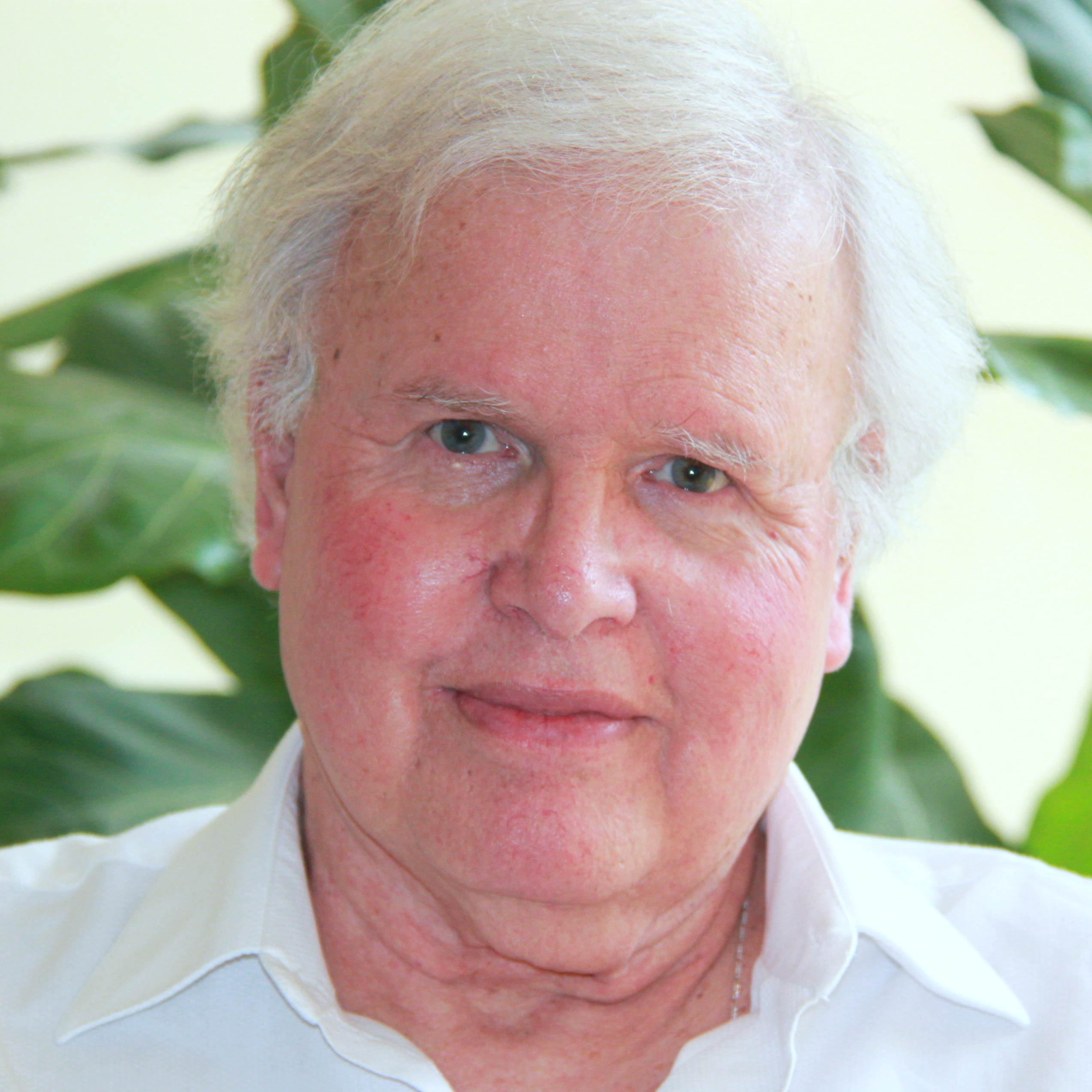
- Beck in 2010
- Born: January 31, 1937
- Died: May 24, 2022 (aged 85); Denton, Texas, U.S.
- Education: B.A., Abilene Christian University, 1958; M.A., Abeline Christian University, 1959; Ph.D., University of Oklahoma, Communication and Social Psychology
- Known for: Spiral Dynamics Integral
- Scientific career
- Fields: Spiral Dynamics, Systems Thinking
- Workplaces: North Texas State University (1961-81); Conoco Corporate University (1998-99); Adizes Graduate School (2000-)

Don Edward Beck (January 31, 1937 – May 24, 2022) was an American teacher, geopolitical advisor, and theorist who focused on applications of large scale psychology, including social psychology, evolutionary psychology, organizational psychology and their effect on human sociocultural systems. He was the co-author of the Spiral Dynamics theory, an evolutionary human development model adapted from the work of his mentor and colleague, developmental psychologist Clare W. Graves, Professor Emeritus in Psychology at Union College in New York, with whom he worked for over a decade.

== Education and academia ==
Beck received a B.A from Abilene Christian College in 1958 and his M.A in Theology and Communication from the same institution a year later in 1959. He was awarded his Ph.D. in Communication and Social Psychology with a focus on large scale systems dynamics and change in 1966 by the University of Oklahoma. His dissertation was on the psychological forces that produced the American Civil War.

Beck held positions at institutions including various roles in the speech and drama department at North Texas State University (now the University of North Texas) from 1961 to 1981, Adjunct Professor at Conoco Corporate University from 1998 to 1999, and Adjunct Instructor at Adizes Graduate School from 2000 to the end of his life.

In 1974, while working as a professor at North Texas State, Beck encountered an article by Graves in The Futurist. He contacted Graves, and at the latter's invitation and flew to New York to meet him in 1975. After two days of dialogues, Beck decided to record Graves' knowledge, as the latter's health was deteriorating. Beck and Graves were later joined by North Texas State faculty member Christopher Cowan. Both Beck and Cowan left North Texas State in 1981 to work with Graves full-time, which they continued to do until Graves's death in 1986.

== Spiral Dynamics ==
Beck and Cowan further developed Graves's emergent cyclical theory and presented a structured evolutionary model of adaptive intelligence called Spiral Dynamics. They first published their construct in Spiral Dynamics: Mastering Values, Leadership, and Change (Exploring the New Science of Memetics) (1996). Through these value systems, groups and cultures structure their societies and individuals integrate within them. Each distinct set of values is developed as a response to solving the problems of the previous system. Changes between states may occur incrementally (first order change) or in a sudden breakthrough (second order change).

Beck and Cowan founded the National Values Center (NVC) in Denton, Texas in 1979

=== Spiral Dynamics (SD) and Spiral Dynamics Integral (SDi) ===
Cowan filed to register "Spiral Dynamics" as a service mark in 1998, while Beck wanted to keep the name open for academic use. The two parted ways in 1999, with Beck continuing to use the Spiral Dynamics name for the next couple of years.

Beck had been drawn to the work of Integral theorist Ken Wilber, whose book A Theory of Everything (2000) incorporated Beck and Cowan's Spiral Dynamics as a "core element" alongside Wilber's AQAL framework.

By 2001, Beck began equating NVC with his new Spiral Dynamics Group, which featured early mentions of Spiral Dynamics Integral. In the last weeks of 2001, Beck announced Spiral Dynamics Integral (SDi). In the announcement, he credited Wilber with significantly increasing the level of interest in Spiral Dynamics, and also cited the influence of John Petersen of the Arlington Institute and Ichak Adizes.

By 2005, Beck's working relationship with Wilber had also disintegrated as Beck felt that Wilber had distorted the Spiral Dynamics/Gravesian model. Wilber subsequently de-emphasized SDi, and recolored its levels to fit his spiritual emphasis.

=== Center for Human Emergence ===
The Center for Human Emergence is a think tank founded in 2004 that emphasizes the scientific understanding of cultures and their evolutionary context.

Beck, in close collaboration with Teddy Hebo Larsen, established the first center for Human Emergence in Copenhagen, Denmark, in May, 2004.

Beck made a number of trips to the Netherlands, starting with work for the Dutch telecom company KPN in the 1990s, including consulting to the Dutch Police force (2004) and leading to the establishment by Peter Merry of the second Center for Human Emergence in the Netherlands in 2005. He continued to support the Dutch Center for Human Emergence, including in the setting up of the Hague Center.

In 2005, Beck, Elza Maalouf, and Said E. Dawlabani created The Center for Human Emergence Middle East (CHE-ME), a non-profit think tank through which his engagement in the region was sponsored. Beck and Maalouf held meetings and trainings hosted in Israel, speaking to the Arab Governor of Bethlehem, Salah Al Taamari; three members of the Palestinian Legislative Council and presenting to 40 city council members, government employees, and professors from Bethlehem University.

As senior adviser to The Center for Human Emergence Middle East, Beck and the center's CEO Elza Maalouf founded the Build Palestine Initiative, focused on the value systems alignment for a two state solution.

Beck and Maalouf presented to the Values Caucus at the United Nations on June 21, 2007, regarding approaches to global governance

== Consulting career ==
Beck made more than 36 trips to South Africa between 1981 and 1988. On May 3, 1995, both houses of the Texas State Legislature (Beck's home state) adopted a resolution (S.R. No. 901) presented by the President of the Texas Senate which commends Beck "for his invaluable contributions toward the peaceful creation of a democratic South Africa."

Beck worked with the Denton Police Department, the Texas Department of Human Services, and the cities of Plano, Grapevine, and Colleyville. He has also consulted for companies including Southwest Airlines and Whole Foods. He worked with the Dallas Cowboys and the South African Springboks rugby team. He also wrote a "Sports Values" column in The Dallas Morning News in 1997–98.

== Death ==
Beck died in Denton, Texas on May 24, 2022, at the age of 85.

== Additional books, audio, video, publications ==
- Spiral Dynamics in Action: Humanity's Master Code. By Don Edward Beck et al. Wiley, 2018. ISBN 1119387183
- Spiral Dynamics: Mastering Values, Leadership, and Change, by Don Beck and Christopher Cowan, 1996, 2005, Wiley/Blackwell, ISBN 1-4051-3356-2
- The Crucible: Forging South Africa's Future, by Don Beck and Graham Linscott, 1991, New Paradigm Press, ISBN 0-620-16241-4
- The Master Code and Integral Politics in Polarized America, by Don E. Beck, Integral Leadership Review, March 2013
- Don Beck: In Quest of the Master Code, at the Inside Edge Foundation, February, 2012, video
- Don Beck: Spiral Dynamics Integral. Sounds True, Boulder, 2006
- Don Beck at the Transformational Leadership Symposium, November 20–21, 2009, video
- Changing the World and Work, ABC National Radio (interview transcript) with Dr. Rachel Kohn
- Conversations with Great Thinkers and Practitioners of Our Times: Dr. Don Beck: Spiral Dynamics: A Challenge To Leadership, produced by Clearfire Media (DVD), 2006, ASIN: B000GGS0VE
- Leap into the Future: Leadership for the 21st Century, with Andrew Cohen and Don Beck, produced by EnlightenNext (DVD), 2004, ASIN: B000O7SX12

== Sources ==
- Beck, Don Edward; Cowan, Christopher C. (8 May 1996). Spiral Dynamics: Mastering Values, Leadership, and Change. Blackwell Publishing. ISBN 978-1557869401.
- Butters, Albion (17 November 2015). "A Brief History of Spiral Dynamics". Approaching Religion. 5 (2): 67–78. doi:10.30664/ar.67574.
