= Tom Atlee =

American activist and author

- Born: 1947 (age 78–79)
- Citizenship: American
- Occupation: Author

Tom Atlee (born 1947) is an American social, peace and environmental activist and author.

== Personal life ==
Born in an intellectual, activist family of Quakers, Atlee experienced social change from an early on. In 1968, he dropped out of Antioch College to organize draft resistance to the Vietnam War. In 1976, daughter Jennifer was born. Participating in the Great Peace March of 1986 – a "watershed experience" to Atlee, he "spent the next 15 years exploring group and organizational phenomena". Atlee lives in an intentional community in Eugene, Oregon.

== Professional life ==
From 1989–1994 Atlee was editor of Thinkpeace, a national journal of peacemaking strategy and philosophy. In 1991 he went to Belize and to Czechoslovakia as a consultant on ecological social change and community-building. From 1991–1992 Atlee served on the boards of the Ecology Center (Berkeley). In 1996, he founded the Co-Intelligence Institute, a non-profit organization facilitating and researching self-organization, collective intelligence, participatory modes of governance and collaborative democracy. A 2004 article in Utne Reader identified him as a radical centrist thinker.

=== Co-Intelligence ===
Co-intelligence according to the FAQ on Atlee's institute website is "shared, integrated form of intelligence that we find in and around us when we're most vibrantly alive. It is also found in cultures that sustain themselves harmoniously with nature and neighbor. ... [it] shows up whenever we pool our personal intelligences to produce results that are more insightful and powerful than the sum of our individual perspectives."

=== Wise Democracy Pattern Language ===
Atlee developed the Wise Democracy Pattern language with the support of Martin Rausch. The first edition was created in 2016. According to their website the Wise Democracy Pattern Language is a pattern language that, "highlights dynamic factors and design principles which can make an activity, organization or community more wisely self-governing." The "prime directive" or fundamental principle of Wise Democracy is "“evoke and engage the wisdom and resourcefulness of the whole on behalf of the whole.”

== Publications ==
=== Books ===
- Atlee, Tom and Karen Mercer (1996): The First Little Book on Co-Intelligence. The Co-Intelligence Institute.
- Atlee, Tom; Judy Laddon and Larry Shook (eds.) (1998): Awakening: The Upside of Y2K. Printed Word
- Atlee, Tom and Rosa Zubizarreta (2003): The Tao of Democracy: Using Co-Intelligence to Create a World that Works for All. The Writers' Collective.
- Atlee, Tom (2009): Reflections on Evolutionary Activism: Essays, Poems and Prayers from an Emerging Field of Sacred Social Change. CreateSpace.
- Atlee, Tom (2012): Empowering Public Wisdom: A Practical Vision of Citizen-Led Politics. North Atlantic Books.
