= Clare W. Graves =

American psychologist

- Born: December 21, 1914; New Richmond, Indiana, U.S.
- Died: January 2, 1986 (aged 71); Rexford, New York, U.S.
- Education: B.A., Union College, Math and Sciences, 1940; M.A., Western Reserve University, Psychology, 1943; Ph.D., Western Reserve University, Psychology, 1945
- Known for: Emergent cyclical levels of existence
- Spouse: Marian Huff Graves
- Children: 2
- Scientific career
- Fields: Psychology
- Workplaces: Western Reserve University (1945–1948); Union College (1948–1986)
- Doctoral advisor: Calvin S. Hall, Jr.

Clare W. Graves (December 21, 1914 – January 3, 1986) was a professor of psychology and originator of the emergent cyclical theory of adult human development, aspects of which were later popularised as Spiral Dynamics. He was born in New Richmond, Indiana.

== Education and academic career ==
Graves graduated from Union College in New York in 1940 and received his master's degree and PhD in psychology in 1943 and 1945, respectively, from Western Reserve University in Cleveland, Ohio. He taught at Western Reserve for three years before returning to Union College as an associate professor in 1948. He was promoted to full Professor in 1956, and retired in 1978.

In 1975, Don Edward Beck, a professor at North Texas University, sought Graves out on the basis of his 1974 article in The Futurist. By this point, Graves's health was declining, and Beck resolved to record Graves's knowledge. They were later joined by Christopher Cowan, with whom Beck developed Spiral Dynamics as an extension of Graves's work. After Graves's death, Cowan, his consulting partner Natasha Todorovic, and archivist William R. Lee, became custodians of Graves's work, maintaining the official Clare W. Graves website, which provides access to some of those materials.

== Emergent cyclical theory ==
In the early mid-twentieth century, Graves decided to conduct experiments that he hoped would reconcile the various approaches to human nature and questions about psychological maturity, as he saw elements of truth and error in all theories known at the time. Rather than construct a hypothesis about how the conflicting systems could be resolved, Graves posed several open-ended questions and looked to see what patterns would emerge from his data. While not typical at the time, these approaches would later become known as grounded theory and inductive thematic analysis.

Based on data collected over the next several decades, Graves observed that the emergence within humans of new bio-psycho-social systems in response to the interplay of external conditions with neurology follows a hierarchy in several dimensions, though without guarantees as to time lines or even direction: both progression and regression are possibilities in his model. Furthermore, each level in the hierarchy alternates as the human is either trying to make the environment adapt to the self, or the human is adapting the self to the existential conditions. He called these 'express self' and 'deny self' systems, and the swing between them is the cyclic aspect of his theory. Graves saw this process of stable plateaus interspersed with change intervals as never ending, up to the limits of the brain of Homo sapiens, something he viewed as far greater than we have yet imagined.

== Influence ==
Through his emergent cyclical theory, Graves has primarily been influential in the area of management theory, both during his lifetime and continuing into more recent years. This was both the first major area in which he published, and a major focus in his posthumous book detailing the complete theory.

While sometimes cited in the context of developmental psychology, Graves is not broadly influential within developmental psychology academia. Graves has been criticized for not fully publishing his theory and data, with one source observing that by "leaving his legacy in not-quite-finished form, and in cultivating followers who have elaborated his ideas leaving them essentially unquestioned, [Graves] appears to have succeeded in leaving us a provocative and important theory, while so far avoiding anything like a debate about its merits."

Graves's ideas gained a broader audience through non-academic publications, most notably a 1974 article in The Futurist which attracted the attention of those who later created Spiral Dynamics. Graves influenced Ken Wilber's integral philosophy both directly and through Spiral Dynamics. Through Spiral Dynamics, he has also influenced metamodernism.

== Works ==
Graves worked towards a book describing his theories, but published few articles and gave few public talks on his work during his lifetime. A full chronological bibliography is available online; a selection of his most notable publications is provided below.

Graves was reportedly distressed by the poor reception given to Abraham Maslow at an American Psychological Association seminar in the mid-1950s and determined not to publish his full theory until he was confident he could defend it. Due to a brain injury sustained in 1975, Graves abandoned his book manuscript in 1977. The manuscript, consisting of largely complete drafts of sections describing the derivation of the theory from experimental data, and comparing it to other theories, was edited together with other primary sources to reconstruct the missing section on the nature of the levels, and published posthumously in 2005 as The Never Ending Quest.

Additionally, an edited transcription of a seminar given by Graves at the Washington School of Psychiatry in 1971, along with a reprint of his 1970 article in the Fall 1970 issue of the Journal of Humanistic Psychology, were collected and published in book form in 2004 as Levels of Human Existence.

- Graves, Clare W. (1966), "Deterioration of Work Standards." Harvard Business Review, September/October 1966, Vol. 44, No. 5, p. 117-126.
- Graves, Clare W. (1970), "Levels of Existence: An Open System Theory of Values." Journal of Humanistic Psychology, Fall 1970, Vol. 10, No. 2, p. 131-155.
- Graves, Clare W. (1974), "Human Nature Prepares for a Momentous Leap." The Futurist, April 1974, p. 72-87.
- Graves, Clare W. (2004). Lee, William R.; Cowan, Christopher C.; Todorovic, Natasha (eds.). Levels of Human Existence. Santa Barbara, CA: ECLET Publishing.
- Graves, Clare W. (2005). Cowan, Christopher C.; Todorovic, Natasha (eds.). The Never Ending Quest. Santa Barbara, CA: ECLET Publishing.

== See also ==
- Abraham Maslow
- Cognitive psychology
- Complex adaptive systems
- Don Edward Beck
- Evolutionary psychology
- Kohlberg's stages of moral development
- Jane Loevinger's stages of ego development
- Metamodernism
- Neuroendocrinology
- Teal organisation
