= Ichak Adizes =

Macedonian management researcher

Ichak K. Adizes
- Born: 1937 (age 88–89); Skopje, North Macedonia
- Occupations: Management consultant and researcher
- Title: Founder of the Adizes Institute

Ichak Kalderon Adizes (/iːtsˈxɑːk əˈdiːzɪs/ uh-DEE-ziss) is a global management consultant, academic, and author known for contributing to organizational development and corporate lifecycles.

== Early life ==
Ichak Adizes is an Israeli-American. He was born in North Macedonia. As a Jewish child during World War II, he hid as a Muslim for protection in Albania. The story was documented in a film entitled I Want To Remember, He Wants To Forget.

In 1948, Adizes moved with his family to Israel, where he served in the Israel Defense Forces. After completing his undergraduate education, he moved to the United States in 1963, where he obtained a doctorate degree in business from Columbia University.

== Career ==
From 1967 to 1982 Adizes was a tenured professor at UCLA, then at Stanford, Tel Aviv University, Hebrew University and Columbia University's executive programs.

Adizes founded the Adizes Institute, which is based in Santa Barbara, California. He is well known in the corporate world for developing the PAEI management model in early 1970s, that categorizes managers into four key roles Producer, Administrator, Entrepreneur and Integrator.

== Personal life ==
Adizes is married to Nurit Manne Adizes. They have six children and live in Carpinteria, California. He plays the accordion.

== Bibliography ==
- Corporate LifeCycles: How and Why Corporations Grow and Die and What to Do About It (Prentice Hall Direct, 1989) ISBN 9780131744004
- Leading the Leaders (2004) ISBN 9780937120057
- The Accordion Player: My Journey from Fear to Love (2023) ISBN 9798986048307
- What Matters in Life: Lessons I Learned from Opening My Heart (2023) ISBN 9798986048338
- Managing Corporate Lifecycles: Predicting Future Problems Today (2023) ISBN 9781952587214
