= Graves's emergent cyclical levels of existence =

Human development theory

Graves's emergent cyclical levels of existence (E-C theory or ECLET) is a theory of adult human development constructed from experimental data by Union College professor of psychology Clare W. Graves. It produces an open-ended series of levels, and has been used as a basis for Spiral Dynamics and other managerial and philosophical systems.

== Names ==
Graves used a variety of names for his theory during his lifetime, ranging from the generic Levels of Human Existence in his earlier work to lengthy names such as Emergent Cyclical, Phenomenological, Existential Double-Helix Levels of Existence Conception of Adult Human Behavior (1978) and Emergent Cyclical Double-Helix Model of the Adult Bio-Psycho-Social Behaviour (1981).

In his posthumously published book, The Never Ending Quest, Graves titled the chapter introducing the theory "The Emergent Cyclical Model," and used the phrases "emergent cyclical conception" ("E-C conception") and "emergent cyclical theory" ("E-C theory") repeatedly as short names throughout the subsequent chapter on verifying his work.

However, "levels of existence" is the more commonly known part of the phrase, and was used in the title of the peer-reviewed 1970 article in the Journal of Humanistic Psychology, the single such academic psychology publication Graves made during his lifetime (although he also presented at academic conferences).

Graves himself considered the levels to be artifacts of the theory, therefore this article adopts the following conventions:

- emergent cyclical theory (E-C theory) is used for the theory itself
- levels of existence refers to the open-ended set of levels generated by the theory
- Gravesian theory, Gravesian thought, or ECLET is used when such precision is not needed, or when there is need to discuss the body of work as a whole

Typographically, this article adopts the letter pair formatting chosen for The Never Ending Quest, which places the letters directly adjacent to each other (AN) rather than hyphenated (A-N). This is the form used in the manuscript abandoned in 1977. Graves used both hyphenated and unhyphenated forms, both before and after abandoning his manuscript. In contrast, in the same source "E-C" for "emergent cyclical" is always hyphenated.

== Motivation and experimental design ==
Graves began his work in response to questions from his students regarding which of various conflicting psychological theories was correct. Rather than construct a hypothesis about how the conflicting systems could be resolved, Graves posed several open-ended questions and looked to see what patterns would emerge from his data. While not typical at the time, these approaches would later become known as grounded theory and inductive thematic analysis.

Graves settled on the following questions to frame his experiments:

1. What will be the nature and character of conceptions of psychological maturity, in the biologically mature human being, produced by biologically mature humans who are intelligent but relatively unsophisticated in psychological knowledge in general, and theory of personality in particular?
2. What will happen to a person's characterization of mature human behavior when s/he is confronted with the criticism of his/her point of view by peers who have also developed their own conception of psychologically mature behavior?
3. What will happen to a person's conception of mature human behavior when confronted with the task of comparing and contrasting his/her conception of psychologically mature human personality to those conceptions which have been developed by authorities in the field?
4. Into what categories and into how many categories, if any, will the conceptions of mature human personality produced by intelligent, biologically mature humans fall?
5. If the conceptions are classifiable, how do they compare structurally and how do they compare functionally?
6. If the conceptions are classifiable, how do the people who fall into classes compare behaviorally as observed in quasi-experimental situations and in every day life?
7. If the conceptions are classifiable, how do the people who fall into one class compare to people who fall into other classes on standardized psychological instruments?

These questions led him to design a four-phase experiment, in which collected pertinent data from his psychology students and others. His initial research, conducted between 1952 and 1959, involved a diverse group of around 1,065 men and women aged 18 to 61. Supplemental studies were carried out over the next twelve years.

=== Phase one: Essays on personal conceptions of the mature adult human ===
Students in Graves's class on "Normal Psychology" were assigned to develop their own personal conception of the psychologically mature adult human. These students included full-time male undergraduates, coed graduate students in teacher education and industrial management, and coed night school students. The students were given four weeks to produce the essay, during which the class covered relevant topics around the nature of personality and relevant human behavior for developing such a conception.

Graves's students were not aware of the research project, and were told that the papers would be graded on:

1. Breadth of coverage of human behavior.
2. Concurrence with established psychological fact.
3. The internal consistency of the conception.
4. The applicability of the conception.

Next, the students spent four weeks in small groups where each student presented their conception to the group and received criticism, after which they turned in a defense of their existing conception, or a modified conception. This step demonstrated the reaction of students to peer criticism. Finally, after another four weeks of small group study of existing conceptions of mature personality in academic psychological literature, the students once again turned in a defense or modification of their conception. This step demonstrated the reaction of students to being confronted by authority. Graves observed the students in their small group work, without their knowledge as logistics allowed, and interviewed each student after the final defense or revision was turned in.

=== Phase two: Classification of the essays ===
Each year, Graves recruited seven to nine new judges who knew nothing of the project, and instructed them as follows:

Take these conceptions of mature personality, study them, then sort them into the fewest possible categories if you find them to be classifiable. Do not force any into categories. If some do not fit any category you decide upon, just place them into an unclassifiable group.

Each judge first produced their own classification, and then the judges produced a single classification by unanimous agreement. Essays for which no unanimous classification could be determined were added to the unclassifiable group.

=== Phase three: Observation of behaviors of groups of people with similar conceptions ===
Graves also taught classes in Organizational/Industrial, Experimental, and Abnormal Psychology, and most of his students from the Phase One studies took one of those classes from him the semester after taking Normal Psychology. These classes were structured such that students were organized into groups which, unknown to them, each contained students with the same classification of mature personality. Students who had not participated in Phase One were grouped together, providing what Graves called a "moderate control" effect. Students in the Organizational and Experimental Psychology classes were given specially designed problems to solve, while those in the Abnormal Psychology class were given many standard psychological tests as part of that class's normal approach. Graves studied the groups through one-way mirrors, gathering data on how they organized themselves, interacted with each other, solved problems, and performed on standard tests.

=== Phase four: Making sense of the data through research ===
From 1960 until his retirement in the late 1970s, Graves researched other work in order to make sense of confusing aspects of his data. Since many adult humans do not take psychology classes (the source of his data), including those from cultures who do not participate in western educational systems, this phase also included research on how such adults might fit with Graves's collected data.

== Development of the theory ==
Graves's analysis of the data collected and researched through the experiments described above became the basis for emergent cyclical (E-C) theory.

Graves theorized that in response to the interaction of external conditions with internal neurological systems, humans develop new bio-psycho-social coping systems to solve existential problems and cope with their worlds. These coping systems are dependent on evolving human culture and individual development, and they are manifested at the individual, societal, and species levels. While there is an ordered progression of stages, later stages are not presented as "better" in the sense of moral superiority. Rather, each level is best suited to the existential problems that caused it to emerge.

E-C theory produces an open-ended system of levels, which set Graves's work apart from many of his contemporaries, such as Abraham Maslow, who sought a final, perfectible state of human development. Both progression and regression through the levels are possible in response to environmental conditions.

=== The emergent cyclical double-helix ===
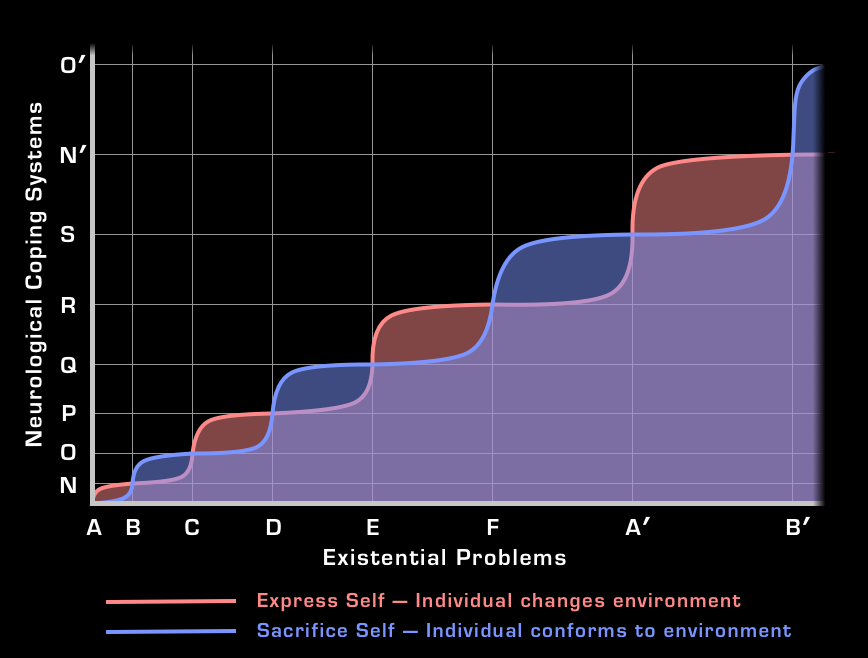
One of several visualizations of Graves's emergent cyclical levels of existence. The prime (') marks are explained under the six upon six hypothesis.

Emergent cyclical theory is more broad than just the well-known set of levels of existence, and Graves considered the levels themselves to simply be artifacts of the theory. E-C theory holds that new bio-psycho-social coping systems emerge within humans in response to the interplay of external life conditions or existential problems with internal neurobiology. It is this interaction, which cycles between what Graves referred to as "express self" and "sacrifice self" systems, which is the core of the theory

Graves identified the existential problems / life conditions with letters in the first half of the alphabet (A, B, C, D, E, F...), and the emergent coping systems with letters in the second half (N, O, P, Q, R, S...). Each system emerges in response to the corresponding existential problems. (N in response to A, O in response to B, etc.) Color codes, which are common in later systems built on E-C theory, are not something that Graves ever used.

When parallel conditions and systems are paired (AN, BO, CP, DQ, ER, FS...), they describe a level of existence. In these states, the active neuronal system is the one most suited to solving the existential problems that are present in their environment. It is also possible to have non-parallel situations, such as a person in an environment with E level problems who has developed the Q neuronal system but not yet the R. This person will often find the world confusing and stressful. On the other hand, a person who is centralized at FS but finds themself in an environment of primarily E problems will be frustrated for other reasons, such as everyone around them seeming to focus on the "wrong" problems and solutions.

Old systems remain available even after new systems are developed, and the level at which a person is centralized can move forwards or backwards. A person centralized at ER who feels the need for more community and spirit can, if conditions are right, move up to FS. Or they might shift back to the familiar DQ at which they were centralized in the past. For most people, multiple systems will be available, although one may dominate.

=== The six upon six hypothesis ===
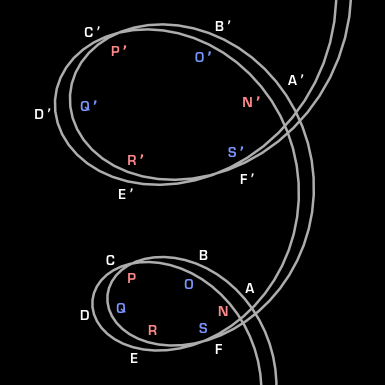
Six upon six spiral model of E-C theory

For most of Graves's original period of research, GT was the latest state to appear. Near the end, a small number of subjects expressing GT in his study shifted to a new state, HU. This emergence, seven or so years into his experiment, of a rare new system is what prompted Graves to view the set of states as open-ended, with no final, ultimate state existing.

Additionally, Graves noted a remarkable similarity between the HU and BO systems, leading him to re-evaluate GT, finding it to have similarities with AN. From this observation, he hypothesized that there are six fundamental coping systems, AN through FS. Beyond FS the cycle repeats with additional neurobiological systems adding much more development on the fundamental states, with the result that "motivations are recapitulated in a much vaster conceptual context." In recognition of this, he began using primes to mark the higher-order systems, renaming GT to A'N' and HU to B'O'. While Graves viewed this hypothesis as unproven, he felt that the data demanded its consideration.

=== Conditions for change ===
A key part of E-C theory is the change process by which a person moves from one level of existence to the next. There are six conditions for change in this process:

1. Potential
2. Solutions of existing problems
3. Feeling of dissonance
4. Gaining of insights
5. Removal of barriers
6. Opportunity to consolidate

Consider a person centralized at ER, who is facing new problems of the F sort, which will require a change to being centralized at FS. The person must have the potential to change, including openness to change. They must have solved the problems of their current level (the E problems), in order to have available energy and resources to focus on the next set of problems (the F problems). They must have felt the dissonance that comes from their currently dominant R system failing to solve the F problems. They must gain insight into how the R system is failing them, and how the S system will help. Any barriers to making this change must be removed or overcome, and once newly centralized at FS, the person needs a supportive environment while they come to fully understand how to successfully exist at this new level.

== The levels of existence ==
While the levels are the most well-known part of E-C theory, Graves emphasized that they are theoretical constructs rather than realities, calling them "the base points from which the living, behaving human varies." In contrast to the values focus of the later Spiral Dynamics formulation, Graves focused on the motivations that he saw as underlying each level, with alternating "express" and "sacrifice" themes.

Unless otherwise noted in the column heading or individual cell, the information in the following table is adapted from the first few pages of each level's description in The Never Ending Quest.

The Levels of Existence produced by Graves's Emergent Cyclical Theory
Letter Pair	6-on-6	Summary	Orientation	Theme	Drive	Existential Problems	Neurological Coping System	Learning Style	Biology
AN		Autistic, Automatic, Reactive Existence	Express self...	...as if just another animal according to the dictates of one's imperative periodic physiological needs	reducing the tension of needs is right	A: Imperative, periodic, physiological needs	N: Attuned to processing relevant info, responds only to change in intensity of the imperative need and not to patterning	habituation	[unspecified / unknown]
BO		Animistic, Tribalistic Existence	Sacrifice self...	...to the traditions of one's elders, one's ancestors	elders, ancestors, and tradition know the right way to be	B: Safety, security, and assurance	O: Attuned to the non-imperative, aperiodic, physiological needs	Pavlovian	[unspecified / unknown]
CP		Egocentric Existence	Express self...	...and to hell with the consequences, lest one suffer the torment of unbearable shame	my way is the right way	C: Boredom, unchanging elder-dominated life	P: Sense consciousness, and consciousness of self, capacity to experience shame	operant or instrumental	noradrenaline > adrenaline
DQ		Absolutistic, Saintly, Moralistic-Prescriptive Existence	Sacrifice self...	...now in order to receive reward later	only one right way to think, based on authority	D: Haves vs have-nots, increased consciousness of self and others, awareness of death	Q: Avoidant learning, guilt, defer gratification, control impulses, rationalize	avoidance conditioning	adrenaline > noradrenaline
ER		Multiplistic, Materialistic Existence	Express self...	...for what self desires, but in a fashion calculated not to bring down the wrath of others	many ways to think, but only one best way	E: Is this the only life I will ever live and, if so, why can't I have some pleasure in this existence?	R: Dispassionate, objective, hypothetico-deductive, not moralistic-prescriptive thinking	expectancy learning	[unspecified / unknown]
FS		Sociocentric, Personalitic, Sociocratic Existence	Sacrifice self...	...now in order to get acceptance now, in order for all to get now	many right ways to think, based on peer group acceptance	F: coming to peace with aloneness, with one's inner self and with others	S: truly experiencing the inner, subjective feelings of humankind	operational learning process	[unspecified / unknown]
GT	A'N'	Systemic, Cognitive, Problematic Existence	Express self...	...for what self desires, but never at the expense of others and in a manner that all life, not just my life, will profit	my way does not have to be yours, nor yours mine, yet I have very strong convictions about what is my way, but never such about yours	A' (G): Threats to the survival of organismic life: depleting natural resources, overpopulation, excessive individuality	N' (T): N system plus some additional system of cells denoted as Y	teacher's job is to pose problems, help provide ways to see them, but to leave the person to their own conclusion as to what answers to accept	something relating to the chemical complex producing fear
HU	B'O'	Intuitive, Experientialist Existence	Sacrifice self...	...by adjusting to the realities of one's existence and automatically accept the existential dichotomies as they are and go on living; sacrifice the idea that one will ever know what it is all about and adjust to this as the existential reality of existence	values what they feel they should, not just what knowledge tells them they should; non-interfering perception rather than active controlling perception	B' (H): Realization how much one will never know about existence, that a problem-solving existence is not enough	O' (U): O system plus some additional system of cells denoted as Y	[unspecified / unknown]	increased galvanic skin resistance

== Verification of the theory ==
Graves compared his conception of adult development with those of many of the leading thinkers of his time, concluding that most were compatible with his view, but often had gaps compared to his set of levels, or only addressed part of the range. In a lengthy examination of Graves's work, Nicholas Reitter considers that in reaching these conclusions "Graves appears in his relative isolation to have convinced himself of greater scientific support than can reasonably be claimed for a particular developmental view such as his, however great its appeal and other merits." However, in his review of The Never Ending Quest, Allan Combs agrees that Graves's theory shows "broad similarities to the highly researched stage the- ories of Lawrence Kohlberg (1981) and Carol Gilligan (1993), as well as Robert Kegan (1994) and others."

Graves also validated aspects of his change process against other researchers who had used recognized scales for measuring a person's psychological state.

== Using the theory with individuals ==
Graves demonstrated that individuals react more quickly to words associated with their value system than with those associated with others. More recent research has built on this to show differences in neurological activation among those operating from individualistic vs collectivistic stages. While some academic research has been done on assessing the presence of bio-psycho-social coping systems in individuals, Graves did not publish any such tools. He noted:

Those who have tried to develop instruments have based them on what people think, do or believe, which is not the proper base for assessment devices. They should be based not on what the person thinks but how s/he thinks, not on what people do or what they believe but how they do what they do, and how they believe that which they do believe.

In the time since Graves's death, assessments have been produced by practitioners of Spiral Dynamics, which is built on E-C theory.

While some have treated Graves's levels as a "simplistic categorization tool," Graves noted that even a person centralized at a particular level drew only roughly 50% on that level, 25% on the level before it, and 25% on the level after. In his original data, Graves found that about 60% of his subjects were centralized around one level, while 40% were more mixed. A person might operate from different levels at home vs at work or in other contexts, and might change to be centralized at either a later or earlier level depending on their environment.

== Criticism ==
Graves's primary data set, which produced the CP-B'O' levels, consisted entirely of students taking his "Normal Psychology" course, raising concerns of sampling bias and lack of diverse life perspectives. During the 1970s, Graves collected additional data from prison populations, industrial workers, and other educational institutions, although it is not documented how this compared to his original methodology, or the degree to which it impacted the theory. Furthermore, the BO and AN levels were the result of research in anthropological literature and therefore not the product of the same methodology as the other levels.

Validating Graves's results is viewed as challenging as his raw data was thrown out towards the end of his life, with only collated results retained. Graves's results as presented in his posthumous writing have been criticized as too vague to support the universality of his conclusions.

Graves's approach of using his students as subjects without their knowledge would be considered ethically dubious today.

Graves's assertions regarding neurobiology lack direct evidence, and are in need of validation by experts in that field.

In his review of The Never Ending Quest, Allan Combs notes that the timeline of the emergence of the levels, while "at home with modern scholarship on the history of consciousness," is speculative beyond what Graves's data could support.

While some variations of Spiral Dynamics have been criticized for producing cult-like communities of practice, several people who level that criticism note that it does not apply to Graves's work itself. In an examination of Graves's work in the June 2018 issue of the Journal of Conscious Evolution, however, Nicholas Reitter connects this phenomenon with Graves having not fully published his ideas during his lifetime. He observes that Graves's ideas are "more often cited, used in conversation, or otherwise recognized tangentially, than they are examined straightforwardly and thus subjected to deliberate acceptance, refutation, or criticism," and that furthermore by "leaving his legacy in not-quite-finished form, and in cultivating followers who have elaborated his ideas leaving them essentially unquestioned, [Graves] appears to have succeeded in leaving us a provocative and important theory, while so far avoiding anything like a debate about its merits."

== Influence ==
E-C theory has primarily been influential in the field of business management, having first been published to a broad audience in the Harvard Business Review after Graves encountered difficulty finding a psychology theory-oriented journal interested in publishing his work. Other researchers in this field built on Graves's work during his lifetime, and his work continues to be cited in journals regarding business-related topics such as change management, cross-cultural management, marketing, sustainability, hiring of workers with disabilities, and the neurology of decision-making. Additionally, Graves's work has formed the basis of several non-academic books on business strategy and change.

Gravesian theory has also been applied in the field of education.

While sometimes referenced in the context of academic publications on psychology, or cited alongside other developmental psychologists such as Jane Loevinger or Lawrence Kohlberg, Graves's ideas are not broadly influential in mainstream psychology or philosophy academia. However, Graves is neither entirely unknown nor entirely dismissed among mainstream developmental psychologists. For example, Loevinger cited his observations on relative developmental levels of managers and employees while defending her concept of ego development as the "master trait" in response to a competing proposal of neuroticism or conscientiousness occupying that role.

Graves's work influenced Ken Wilber's integral theory starting no later than 1995, prior to the publication of Spiral Dynamics. By way of Spiral Dynamics, this influence became increasingly prominent during the 2000s, although subsequent changes by Wilber have diverged from Graves in some respects such as truncating the second "tier" of stages to two, contradicting the "six upon six" hypothesis.

E-C theory has also influenced, again by way of Spiral Dynamics, developmental metamodernism.
