= Jane Loevinger =

Developmental psychologist

- Born: February 6, 1918; Saint Paul, Minnesota, U.S.
- Died: January 4, 2008 (aged 89); St. Louis, Missouri, U.S.
- Education: University of Minnesota; University of California, Berkeley
- Spouse: Samuel Isaac Weissman
- Scientific career
- Fields: Developmental Psychology
- Workplaces: Washington University in St. Louis

Jane Loevinger Weissman (February 6, 1918 – January 4, 2008) was an American developmental psychologist who developed a theory of personality which emphasized the gradual internalization of social rules and the maturing conscience for the origin of personal decisions. She also contributed to the statistical theory of measurement by introducing the H coefficient of test homogeneity. In the tradition of developmental stage models, Loevinger integrated several "frameworks of meaning-making" into a model of humans' constructive potentials that she called ego development (or in German, Ich-Entwicklung). The essence of the ego is the striving to master, to integrate, and make sense of experience. She also is credited with the creation of an assessment test, the Washington University Sentence Completion Test.

== Early life ==
Jane Loevinger was the third of five children born to Gustavus Loevinger and Millie Strause, and was born into a Jewish American family.

== Education and accomplishments ==
As a child, Loevinger showed proficiency among her classmates, often achieving far above the rest. She went to the University of Minnesota in hopes of pursuing psychology, where she was told that this major was too mathematical for her. Despite the odds, Loevinger declared her major as psychology and managed to graduate magna cum laude at the young age of 19. She then went on to earn her master of science degree in psychometrics at the age of 21. She developed the statistical index that bears her name – Loevinger's H. This index is the basis of Mokken scaling, a versatile nonparametric method of constructing a Guttman scale from a pool of candidate items. Loevinger's H has since been shown to be the fundamental statistic that underlies all measures of statistical agreement of two binary variables such as Cohen's Kappa.

Still intrigued with the world of psychology, Loevinger went on to enroll in graduate school at the University of California, Berkeley, where she was a research assistant for Erik Erikson.

In 1943, Loevinger married Samuel Isaac Weissman (June 25, 1912 – June 12, 2007), a scientist who contributed to the Manhattan Project. They had a son and a daughter. Samuel Weissman worked on the weapon design of the atomic bomb in New Mexico, while Loevinger stayed at Berkeley to finish her dissertation. The family then moved to St. Louis where Jane taught part-time at the Washington University in St. Louis.

After growing frustrated with her time teaching and facing the societal pressures of being a working mother, Loevinger decided to begin her own research, specifically about women and mothers. During this time, Loevinger and her research team developed a number of studies and findings, including the renowned Washington University Sentence Completion Test.

== See also ==
- Psychological testing
- Loevinger's stages of ego development

== Other key publications ==
- Loevinger, J. (1970). Measuring Ego Development. San Francisco: Jossey-Bass.
- Loevinger, J. (1976). Ego Development. San Francisco: Jossey-Bass.
- Loevinger, J. (1987). Paradigms of Personality. New York: Freeman.
- Hy, L. X. & Loevinger, J. (1996). Measuring Ego Development, 2nd Ed. Mahwah, NJ: Erlbaum.
