= H. W. L. Poonja =

Indian Sage

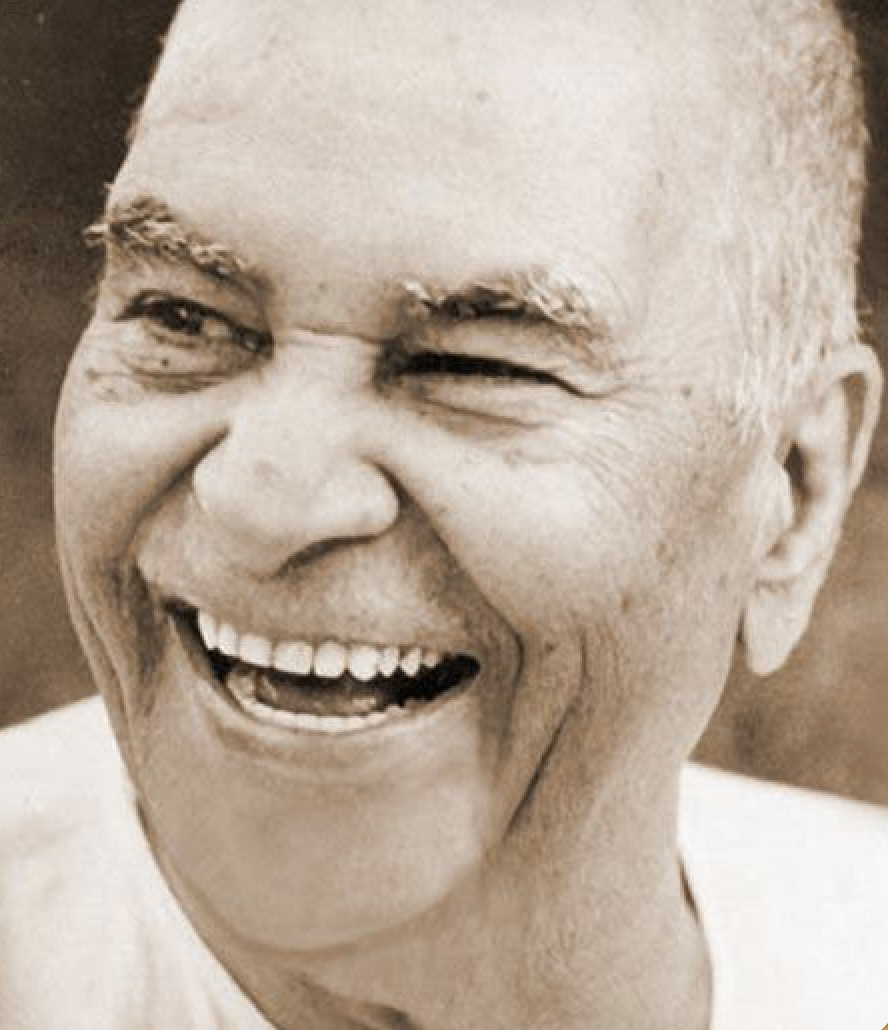
- H. W. L. Poonja, often known as "Papaji"

Personal life
- Born: Hariwansh Lal Poonja; 13 October 1910 (or later) Punjab, British India
- Died: 6 September 1997 (aged 87) Lucknow, India

Religious life
- Religion: Hinduism
- Philosophy: Advaita Vedanta

Religious career
- Teacher: Bhagavan Sri Ramana Maharshi

Quotation

No teaching, no teacher, no student.

Hariwansh Lal Poonja (/ˈpʊndʒə/; born 13 October 1910 (or later) in Punjab, British India – 6 September 1997 in Lucknow, India) was an Indian sage. Poonja was called "Poonjaji" or "Papaji" by devotees.

== Biography ==
=== Early life ===
At the age of six, he spontaneously experienced a state of supreme consciousness:

The experience was so overwhelming it had effectively paralysed my ability to respond to any external stimuli. People tried everything they could think of to bring me back to a normal state of consciousness, but all their attempts failed.

His mother, an ardent devotee of Lord Krishna, persuaded her son, who had experienced this state of supreme consciousness, saying: "Did you see Krishna? If you see Krishna again, you will be able to experience this supreme state once more." From that time on, Poonjaji came to love Lord Krishna with great fervour, and Lord Krishna appeared before him many times. And they played together.

=== The Search for God ===
Poonjaji constantly sought to see Lord Krishna, and travelled throughout India visiting saints and sages, asking each of them: "Can you show me God?" However, the great saints would only reply: "It takes decades of spiritual practice before one can see God. Come and practise at our ashram."

Then one day, a sadhu appeared at our door, asking for food. I invited him in, offered him some food and asked him: "Can you show me God? If not, do you know of anyone who can?" Much to my surprise he told me: "Yes, I know a person who can show you God. His name is Ramana Maharshi." And he gave him the address.

=== Meeting Ramana Maharshi ===
Poonjaji visited Ramana Maharshi's ashram and asked him the same question as always. However, rather than giving him a vision of God, Ramana Maharshi directed his awareness toward his own Self:

"Have you seen God?" I asked. "If you have, can you enable me to see Him? I am willing to pay any price, even my life." "No," he answered, "I cannot show you God or enable you to see God because God is not an object that can be seen. God is the subject. He is the Seer. Don't concern yourself with objects that can be seen. Find out who the seer is." He also added, "You alone are God," as if to rebuke me for looking for a God who was outside and apart from me.

From that time on, Poonjaji found that the desire to think of God or to perform japa and other spiritual practices had completely vanished. He sought Ramana Maharshi's help once more.

I sat before Maharshi and began to speak.

"For twenty-five years I have been repeating the name of Krishna. Until recently I was chanting it fifty thousand times a day. I had also been reading many spiritual books. Then Rama, Sita, Lakshmana and Hanuman appeared before me. After they left, I found I could no longer continue my practices. I can no longer do japa, read books, or meditate. Inwardly it is very quiet, but the desire to direct my attention toward God has gone. I actually tried, but I simply cannot. My mind refuses to think of God. What is happening? What should I do?"

Maharshi looked at me and asked: "How did you come here from Madras?" "By train," I replied. "What did you do when you arrived at the station?"

"I got off the train and hired a bullock cart to take me to the ashram." "What happened to the bullock cart after you arrived at the ashram?" "It probably went back to town."

Maharshi explained his meaning.

"The train brought you to your destination. Since you no longer needed the train, you got off. It had carried you to where you wanted to go. Similarly, the bullock cart brought you to Ramana Ashram. Having arrived at the ashram, you no longer needed the bullock cart, so you got off. They were simply the means to get here. Now that you are here, you no longer need them.

Your japa is the same. Your japa, your reading, your meditation — they carried you to your spiritual destination. You no longer need them. It was not that you yourself stopped practising; rather, they had fulfilled their role and so departed from you. You have arrived."

Then he gazed at me intently. I could feel that my whole body and mind were being washed with waves of purity. They were being purified by his silent gaze. I could feel him looking intently into my Heart. Under that spellbinding gaze I felt every atom of my body being purified.

It was as if a new body was being created for me. A process of transformation was going on — the old body was dying, atom by atom, and a new body was being created in its place.

Then, suddenly, I understood. I knew that this man who had spoken to me was, in reality, what I already was, what I had always been. There was a sudden impact of recognition as I became aware of the Self. I use the word "recognition" deliberately, because as soon as the experience was revealed to me, I knew, unerringly, that this was the same state of peace and happiness that I had been immersed in as a six-year-old boy in Lahore.

The silent gaze of the Maharshi re-established me in that primal state. The desire to search for an external God perished in the direct knowledge and experience of the Self which the Maharshi revealed to me. I cannot describe exactly what the experience was or is because the books are right when they say that words cannot convey it. I can only talk about peripheral things. I can say that every cell, every atom in my body leapt to attention as they all recognised and experienced the Self that animated and supported them, but the experience itself I cannot describe. I knew that my spiritual quest had definitely ended, but the source of that knowledge will always remain indescribable.

— Nothing Ever Happened Volume One

== Devotees ==
H. W. L. Poonja later settled in Lucknow, where he received visitors from all around the world. Among his well-known devotees who give satsang are Mira Ganga, Gangaji and Mooji. Besides these prominent devotees, Ram Dass (Richard Alpert), Christopher Titmuss, and Sam Harris also visited Poonjaji several times in the early 1990s.

David Godman, a devotee of Ramana Maharshi, moved to Lucknow in 1992 to spend time around Poonjaji and remained until Poonjaji's passing in 1997. Godman wrote prolifically about Poonjaji, including the interview anthology Papaji Interviews, The Fire of Freedom, and the three-volume, 1,200-page biography Nothing Ever Happened, and also released interview videos.

== Teaching ==
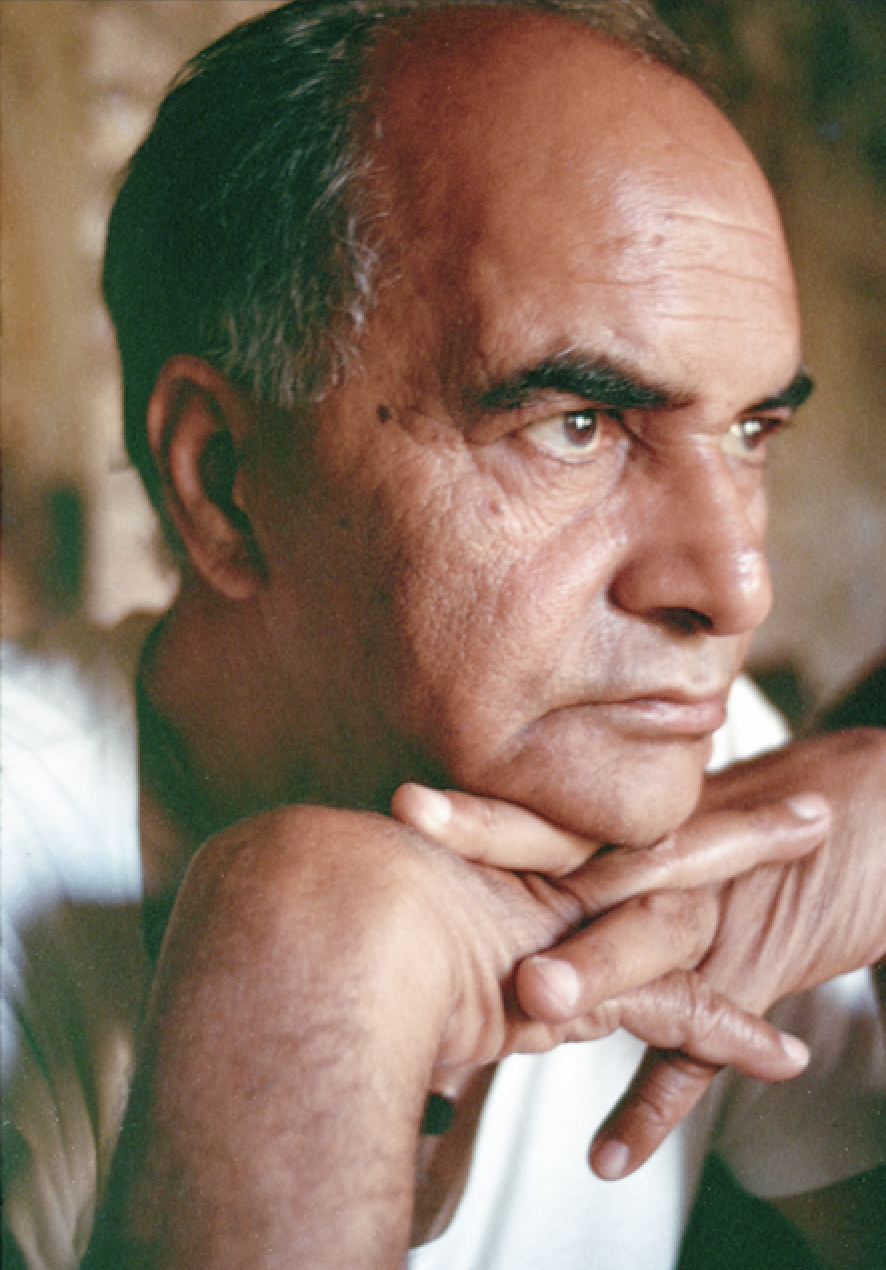
Poonjaji at Rishikesh

=== Teaching through Silence ===
His teaching emphasises that words can only point to ultimate truth but can never themselves be ultimate truth, and that intellectual understanding alone — without directly realising truth through self-enquiry — is insufficient. Like Sri Ramana, he stressed that teaching through silence points to truth more directly than teaching through words.

=== The Process ===
Poonjaji described "the process and conditions for Self-realisation to occur" as follows:

- "There must be a desire for God, a love for Him, or an ardent desire for liberation. Without that, realisation is impossible."
- "This desire for God or realisation is like an inner flame. One must kindle it and fan it until it becomes a raging fire that consumes all other desires and interests."
- "If this inner flame burns long and intensely enough, it will finally consume even the desire for God or the Self itself, and at that point all desires will be extinguished."
- The final ingredient is the presence of the Master: "When Maharshi's gaze met my vasana-free mind, the Self reached out and destroyed it in such a way that it could never rise or function again. And in the end, only the Self remained."

=== Self-Enquiry ===
Like his teacher Sri Ramana, his message was always that the Self is already realised and always free. Like Sri Ramana, he taught self-enquiry — the practice of locating the thought of the individual "I," the sense of "I," tracing back where it arises from, and abiding at the source of one's own existence. He maintained that all forms of practice and sadhana other than self-enquiry merely sustain the existence of the ego that performs them and cannot destroy the ego itself; he therefore recommended self-enquiry and surrender.

=== Liberation ===
According to Poonjaji, Self-realisation is in itself liberation from karmic cause and effect and from rebirth. Poonjaji stated: "Even after Self-realisation, the karma that is destined to be experienced in this life continues to unfold, but since the realised being no longer identifies with it, no further karmic consequences are accumulated. Therefore, there is no rebirth for such a one."

Be quiet, don't think, don't make effort.

To be bound takes effort, to be Free takes no effort.
Peace is beyond thought and effort.
Do not think and do not make effort because this only obscures That,
and will never reveal That.
This is why keeping Quiet is the key to the storehouse of love and peace.

This Quietness is no-mind, this no-thought is Freedom.
Identify yourself as this Nothingness, as this Quietness,
and be careful not to make it an experience
because this is mind tricking you out of it with the trap of duality;
the trap of witness and witnessed.
Being is Being, there is no witness and no witnessed.
Experiencing it is to say "I am Free,"
which is exactly the same trap as saying "I am bound."
After letting go of object do not hold onto the subject either.

Let go, Be Quiet.

== Works ==
- Poonja, H. W. L. (1992). Wake Up and Roar. Pacific Center Pub. ISBN 978-1-59179-589-6.
- Poonja, H. W. L. (1993). Godman, David (ed.). Papaji: Interviews. Avadhuta Foundation. ISBN 978-0963802200.
- Poonja, H. W. L. (2000). This: Prose and Poetry of Dancing Emptiness. Red Wheel Weiser. ISBN 978-1578631766.
- Poonja, H. W. L. (2000). De Jager, Prashanti (ed.). The Truth Is. Weiser Books. ISBN 978-1578631759.
