= Spiral Dynamics =

Model of human development

Spiral Dynamics is a model of human development that posits a discrete and linear series of "stages of development" that individuals, organizations, and societies progress through, within dynamic and non-linear processes. It lacks mainstream academic validity or support, although it has been applied in management consulting and some academic literature.

It was initially developed by psychologist Don Edward Beck and communications lecturer Christopher Cowan based on memetic theory and the emergent cyclical theory of Clare W. Graves. A later collaboration between Beck and American writer Ken Wilber produced Spiral Dynamics Integral (SDi). Several variations of Spiral Dynamics presently exist, with some drawing upon Wilber's integral theory.

== History ==
In the late 1960s and early 1970s, Union College psychology professor Clare W. Graves published a series of articles which described what he referred to as an "emergent cyclical theory" of developmental psychology and human development.

Spiral Dynamics emerged as a result of a collaboration between University of North Texas (UNT) professor Don Beck, communications lecturer Christopher Cowan, and Graves. Beck and Graves first met in person in 1975, and was joined by Cowan shortly after in developing Graves's emergent cyclical theory, working closely with Graves until his death in 1986. In 1979, Beck and Cowan founded the consulting company National Values Center, Inc. (NVC). By 1981, both Beck and Cowan had resigned from UNT to work with Graves. During the 1980s and 1990s, Beck made over 60 trips to South Africa applying Graves's emergent cyclical theory in various projects. This experience, along with others Beck and Cowan had applying the theory in North America, motivated the development of Spiral Dynamics.

Beck and Cowan first published their original extension of Graves's theory in the 1996 book Spiral Dynamics: Mastering Values, Leadership, and Change (Exploring the New Science of Memetics). At around the same time, new-age author Ken Wilber published Sex, Ecology, Spirituality (1995), which expounded and drew heavily upon Graves's work. Beck and Cowan introduced a color-coding for the eight value systems identified by Graves, and predicted a ninth value system. Additionally, Beck and Cowan integrated ideas from the field of memetics, identifying memetic attractors for each of Graves's levels. These attractors, which they called "^{V}Memes", are said to bind memes into cohesive packages which structure the worldviews of both individuals and societies.

In 1998, Cowan and Natasha Todorovic formed their own consulting company, NVC Consulting (NVCC). In the same year, Cowan filed for the service mark of "Spiral Dynamics" service mark, which was registered to NVC. Beck was against the nature of Spiral Dynamics as a service mark, and by 1999, the pair had ceased collaborating, in part due to Cowan's opposition to Wilber's theory, which he regarded as overtly spiritual and unrelated to Graves's original theory. That same year, Wilber published The Collected Works of Ken Wilber, Vol. 4: Integral Psychology, which contained the first Spiral Dynamics reference in literature at the time.

Following the split of NVC, Cowan and Wilber began to expound upon two different conceptions of Spiral Dynamics. Wilber's theory increasingly incorporated elements of spirituality, religion and original concepts drawn from his integral theory. In the early 2000s, Beck and Wilber launched the Integral Institute and the Spiral Dynamics Integral (SDi) brand. Beck also founded the Center for Human Emergence. By 2005, however, Beck and Wilber had fallen out due to disagreements on Wilber's changes to SDi. The following year, Wilber published Integral Spirituality, which incorporated chakras into SDi theory.

In 2009, NVC was dissolved as business entity, and the original SD service mark (officially registered to NVC) was canceled. The next year, Cowan and Todorovic re-filed for the SD service mark and trademark, which was registered to NVCC. By 2010, the three theories of Spiral Dynamics comprised Cowan and Todorovic's trademarked "SPIRAL DYNAMICS®", which purported to be fundamentally the same as Graves's emergent cyclical theory; Don Beck advocating SDi with a community of practice around various chapters of his Centers for Human Emergence; and Ken Wilber subordinating SDi to his similarly but-not-identically colored AQAL altitudes, with a greater focus on spirituality.

== Theories ==
Spiral Dynamics describes how value systems and worldviews emerge from the interaction of social and historical conditions and mental processes. While the value systems occur in a particular order, the purpose of development within Spiral Dynamics is to align value systems with the relevant life conditions rather than reach a set end goal. Under the theory, groups and cultures structure their societies around corresponding set of values, with each new value stage developed as a response to solving existing problems. Changes between states that occur incrementally are described as "first-order changes", whilst changes that emerge from a sudden breakthrough are known as "second-order changes". The emphasis on life conditions as essential to the progression through value systems is unusual among similar theories, and leads to the view that no level is inherently positive or negative, but rather is a response to the local environment.

=== Beck and Cowan's original theory ===
^{V}Memes as described in Spiral Dynamics (1996)
Color	Graves code	Description	Attributes
First Tier
Beige	A-N	SurvivalSense — Instinctive	Automatic, reflexive; Centers around satisfaction; Driven by deep brain programs, instincts and genetics; Little awareness of self as a distinct being (undifferentiated); Lives "off the land" much as other animals; Minimal impact on or control over environment
Purple	B-O	KinSpirits — Clannish	Obey desires of the mystical spirit beings; Show allegiance to elders, custom, clan; Preserve sacred places, objects, rituals; Bond together to endure and find safety; Live in an enchanted, magical village; Seek harmony with nature's power
Red	C-P	PowerGods — Egocentric	In a world of haves and have-nots, it's good to be a have; Avoid shame, defend reputation, be respected; Gratify impulses and sense immediately; Fight remorselessly and without guilt to break constraints; Don't worry about consequences that may not come
Blue	D-Q	TruthForce — Purposeful	Find meaning and purpose in living; Sacrifice self to the Way for deferred reward; Bring order and stability to all things; Control impulsivity and respond to guilt; Enforce principles of righteous living; Divine plan assigns people to their places
Orange	E-R	StriveDrive — Strategic	Strive for autonomy and independence; Seek out "the good life" and material abundance; Progress through searching out the best solutions; Enhance living for many through science and technology; Play to win and enjoy competition; Learning through tried-and-true experience
Green	F-S	HumanBond — Relativistic	Explore the inner beings of self and others; Promote a sense of community and unity; Share society's resources among all; Liberate humans from greed and dogma; Reach decisions through consensus; Refresh spirituality and bring harmony
Second Tier
Yellow	G-T	FlexFlow — Systemic	Accept the inevitability of nature's flows and forms; Focus on functionality, competence, flexibility, and spontaneity; Find natural mix of conflicting "truths" and "uncertainties"; Discovering personal freedom without harm to others or excesses of self-interest; Experience fullness of living on an Earth of such diversity in multiple dimensions; Demand integrative and open systems
Turquoise	H-U	GlobalView — Holistic	Blending and harmonizing a strong collective of individuals; Focus on the good of all living entities as integrated systems; Expanded use of human brain/mind tools and competencies; Self is part of larger, conscious, spiritual whole that also serves self; Global networking seen as routine; Acts for minimalist living so less actually is more
Coral	I-V	unknown	unknown

=== Cowan and Todorovic's "Spiral Dynamics" ===
In 2008, Cowan and Todorovic published an article on Spiral Dynamics in the peer-reviewed journal Strategy & Leadership, edited and published Graves's unfinished manuscript, and generally took the position that the distinction between Spiral Dynamics and Graves's ECLET is primarily one of terminology. Holding this view, they opposed interpretations seen as "heterodox."

Cowan and Todorovic's view of Spiral Dynamics stands in opposition to that of Ken Wilber. Wilber biographer Frank Visser describes Cowan as a "strong" critic of Wilber and his integral theory, particularly the concept of a "Mean Green Meme." Todorovic produced a paper arguing that research refutes the existence of the "Mean Green Meme" as Beck and particularly Wilber described it.

=== Beck's "Spiral Dynamics integral" (SDi) ===
By early 2000, Beck was corresponding with Wilber about Spiral Dynamics and using a "4Q/8L" diagram combining Wilber's four quadrants with the eight known levels of Spiral Dynamics. Beck officially announced SDi as launching on January 1, 2002, aligning Spiral Dynamics with integral theory and additionally citing the influence of John Petersen of the Arlington Institute and Ichak Adizes. By 2006, Wilber had introduced a slightly different color sequence for his AQAL "altitudes", diverging from Beck's SDi and relegating it to the values line, which is one of many lines within AQAL.

Later influences on SDi include the work of Muzafer Sherif and Carolyn Sherif in the fields of realistic conflict and social judgement, specifically their Assimilation Contrast Effect model and Robber's Cave study

=== SD/SDi and Ken Wilber's Integral Theory ===
Ken Wilber briefly referenced Graves in his 1986 book Transformations of Consciousness, and again in 1995's Sex, Ecology, Spirituality, which also introduced his four quadrants model. However, it was not until the "Integral Psychology" section of 1999's Collected Works: Volume 4 that he integrated Gravesian theory, now in the form of Spiral Dynamics. Beck and Wilber began discussing their ideas with each other around this time.

==== AQAL "altitudes" ====
By 2006, Wilber was using SDi only for the values line, one of many lines in his All Quadrants, All Levels/Lines (AQAL) framework. In the book Integral Spirituality published that year, he introduced the concept of "altitudes" as an overall "content-free" system to correlate developmental stages across all of the theories on all of the lines integrated by AQAL.

The altitudes used a set of colors that were ordered according to the rainbow, which Wilber explained was necessary to align with color energies in the tantric tradition. This left only Red, Orange, Green, and Turquoise in place, changing all of the other colors to greater or lesser degrees. Furthermore, where Spiral Dynamics theorizes that the 2nd tier would have six stages repeating the themes of the six stages of the 1st tier, in the altitude system the 2nd tier contains only two levels (corresponding to the first two SD 2nd tier levels) followed by a 3rd tier of four spiritually-oriented levels inspired by the work of Sri Aurobindo. Beck and Cowan each consider this 3rd tier to be non-Gravesian.

Spiral Dynamics vs AQAL altitudes
SD / SDi			AQAL altitudes		
source	tier	level	level	tier	source
directly from Graves	2nd	???	Clear Light	3rd	inspired by Aurobindo
directly from Graves	2nd	???	Ultraviolet	3rd	inspired by Aurobindo
directly from Graves	2nd	???	Violet	3rd	inspired by Aurobindo
directly from Graves	2nd	Coral	Indigo	3rd	inspired by Aurobindo
directly from Graves	2nd	Turquoise	Turquoise	2nd	analogous to Graves
directly from Graves	2nd	Yellow	Teal	2nd	analogous to Graves
directly from Graves	1st	Green	Green	1st	analogous to Graves
directly from Graves	1st	Orange	Orange	1st	analogous to Graves
directly from Graves	1st	Blue	Amber	1st	analogous to Graves
directly from Graves	1st	Red	Red	1st	analogous to Graves
directly from Graves	1st	Purple	Magenta	1st	analogous to Graves
directly from Graves	1st	Beige	Infrared	1st	analogous to Graves

Wilber critic Frank Visser notes that while Wilber gives a correspondence of his altitude colors to chakras, his correspondence does not actually match any traditional system for coloring chakras, despite Wilber's assertion that using the wrong colors would "backfire badly when any actual energies were used." He goes on to note that Wilber's criticism of the SD colors as "inadequate" ignores that they were not intended to correlate with any system such as chakras. In this context, Visser expresses sympathy for Beck and Cowan's dismay over what Visser describes as "vandalism" regarding the color scheme, concluding that the altitude colors are an "awkward hybrid" of the SD and rainbow/chakra color systems, both lacking the expressiveness of the former and failing to accurately correlate with the latter.

== Validity and reception ==
Spiral Dynamics has been criticized by some as appearing to be like a cult, with undue prominence given to the business and intellectual property concerns of its leading advocates. Psychologist Keith Rice, discussing his application of SDi in individual psychotherapy, notes that it encounters limitations in accounting for temperament and the unconscious.

The journalist Patrick Vermeren argues that Spiral Dynamics is an ideological construct that is in blatant contradiction to scientific facts and has no theoretical or empirical validity, noting that Graves' speculative assumptions about human developmental stages contradict established findings in biology, physics and evolutionary psychology. Vermeren also criticises Spiral Dynamics as ahistorical and factually inaccurate in its dating of human development stages; arbitrary in its use of color codes; reliant upon esoteric and pseudoscientific concepts; contradictory to evolutionary theory; and primarily a tool that consultants use to sell services to HR professionals.

Nicholas Reitter, writing in the Journal of Conscious Evolution, observes:

On the other hand, the SD authors seem also to have magnified some of the weaknesses in Graves' approach. The occasional messianism, unevenness of presentation and constant business-orientation of Graves' (2005) manuscript is transmuted in the SD authors' book (Beck and Cowan 1996) into a sometimes-bewildering array of references to world history, pop culture and other topics, often made in helter-skelter fashion.

=== Influence and applications ===
Spiral Dynamics has been applied in some academic articles on management theory, which was the primary focus of the 1996 Spiral Dynamics book. John Mackey and Rajendra Sisodia write that the vision and values of conscious capitalism as they articulate it are consistent with the "2nd tier" ^{V}MEMES. Rica Viljoen's case study of economic development in Ghana demonstrates how understanding the Purple ^{V}MEME allows for organizational storytelling that connects with diverse (non-Western) worldviews.

Spiral Dynamics has also been noted as an example of applied memetics. Schlaile also notes Said Dawlabani's SDi-based "MEMEnomics" as an alternative to his own "economemetics" in his chapter examining memetics and economics in the same book. Elza Maalouf argues that SDi provides a "memetic" interpretation of non-Western cultures that Western NGOs often lack, focusing attention on the "indigenous content" of the culture's value system.

Spiral Dynamics remains influential in new-age philosophy and spirituality.

SDi has also been referenced in the fields of education, urban planning, and cultural analysis.

== Notes ==
=== Works cited ===
- Beck, Don Edward; Cowan, Christopher C. (8 May 1996). Spiral Dynamics: Mastering Values, Leadership, and Change. Blackwell Publishing. ISBN 978-1-55786-940-1.
- Butters, Albion (17 November 2015). "A Brief History of Spiral Dynamics". Approaching Religion. 5 (2). Donner Institute for Research in Religious and Cultural Studies: 67–78. doi:10.30664/ar.67574.
- Cacioppe, Ron; Edwards, Mark (1 March 2005). "Seeking the Holy Grail of Organisational Development". Leadership & Organization Development Journal. 26 (2). Emerald: 86–105. doi:10.1108/01437730510582536.
- Cook, John Edward (October 2008). The Role of the Individual in Organisational Cultures: a Gravesian Integrated Approach (PhD). Sheffield Hallam University.
- Nasser, Ilham (March 2021). Mapping the Terrain Report: 2019–2020 (Technical report). Advancing Education in Muslim Societies. International Institute of Islamic Thought. doi:10.47816/mtt.2019-2020-march2021. (Note on page ii: "This study was approved by Indiana University Institutional Review Board (IRB)." Note also that a previous report was published as: Nasser, Ilham (June 2020). "Mapping the Terrain of Education 2018–2019: A Summary Report". Journal of Education in Muslim Societies. Indiana University Press. 1 (2): 3–21. doi:10.2979/jems.1.2.08, but is not freely downloadable.)
- Reitter, Nicholas (Jun 2018). "Clare W. Graves and the Turn of Our Times". Journal of Conscious Evolution. 11 (11). California Institute of Integral Studies. Article 5.
- Schuitemaker, Lisette; Merry, Peter; Voorhoeve, Anne-Marie (31 October 2012). "The Case of the Center for Human Emergence Netherlands". In Zoeteman, Kees (ed.). Sustainable Development Drivers: The Role of Leadership in Government, Business and NGO Performance. Edward Elgar. ISBN 978-0-85793-489-5.
- Visser, Frank (2017). "Climbing the Stairway to Heaven: Reflections on Ken Wilber's "The Religion of Tomorrow"" (PDF). Integral World.
