= Teal organisation =

Organisational paradigm

A teal organization is one that adheres to workers' self-management. The organizational theory term was coined in 2014 by Frederic Laloux in his book Reinventing Organizations. Laloux uses a descriptive model in which he describes different types of organizations in terms of colour, and he cites studies by evolutionary and social psychologists including Jean Gebser, Clare W. Graves, Don Edward Beck, Chris Cowan and Ken Wilber.

== Model ==
Laloux defines a "teal" (a greenish-blue color) organisation as one where the management is based on worker autonomy and peer relationships. He contrasts this to:

- Red organizations: Characterized by authoritarian structures and control through fear.
- Amber organizations: Structured around rigid hierarchies and top-down command.
- Orange organizations: Operate on meritocratic principles, emphasizing competition and performance.
- Green organizations: Focus on consensus and stakeholder values, often emphasizing culture and empowerment.

The theory of Teal organizations is built on three core concepts: self-management, wholeness, and evolutionary purpose.

Self-management replaces traditional hierarchy with a system where employees manage themselves and collaborate on decisions, distributing authority more evenly.

Wholeness encourages employees to integrate their personal and professional identities, fostering a work environment that prioritizes emotional well-being and authenticity.

Evolutionary purpose sees teal organizations as living entities that adapt and evolve naturally, guided by their own sense of direction rather than rigid strategic plans or profit motives.

== Examples ==
A number of notable organisations around the world have adopted and operate with the teal organisation model, some of which are in the table below:

Organization	Business, mission, or activity	Office location(s)	Ref.
Morning Star Co.	Food processing	United States	
AES	Energy	International	
Buurtzorg	Health care	Netherlands	

== See also ==
- Alternative Theory of Organization and Management
- Sociocracy
- Holacracy
- Organizational culture
- Organization development
