= Reinventing Organizations =

Book by Frédéric Laloux

Reinventing Organizations: A Guide to Creating Organizations Inspired by the Next Stage of Human Consciousness
- First edition
- Author: Frédéric Laloux
- Language: French; English
- Genre: Management; economics; sociology; anthropology; philosophy
- Publisher: Diateino
- Publication date: 2014
- Publication place: Belgium

Reinventing Organizations: A Guide to Creating Organizations Inspired by the Next Stage of Human Consciousness is a book written by Frédéric Laloux and published in 2014. It lists the different paradigms of the human organizations through the ages and proposes a new one: Teal organisation. The latter is built on three pillars related to wholeness, self-management, and evolutionary purpose.

== Overview ==
Frédéric Laloux screened and researched over fifty organisations, including Buurtzorg Nederland and The Morning Star Company, with the following conditions: they had been operating for at least five years with a minimum of one hundred employees, and with a significant number of management practices that were consistent with the Teal level of consciousness. Laloux describes the five stages of organisational structure, each of which is designated a colour (Red, Amber, Orange, Green, Teal) depending on how 'evolved' they are. He describes the management structure and developments associated with each stage, such as the creation of meritocracy and replicable processes.

The current stage, Teal, is the one that Laloux has based his research and the book around. Teal is driven by self-management, intuitive reasoning, decentralised decision-making, wholeness, and a deeper sense of purpose. Depending on the edition, Laloux goes into varying detail about the practices associated with self-management, wholeness, and evolutionary purpose, as well as giving case studies that exemplify said practices.

== See also ==
- Alternative Theory of Organization and Management
- Holacracy
- Organizational culture
- Organization development
- Organizational theory
- Workers' self-management

== Notes and references ==
- HuffPost, Reinventing Management, Part 1: What Color Is Your Organization?, 06/12/2017
- Strategy+Business, The Future of Management Is Teal, 06/07/2015

== Bibliography ==
- Frederic Laloux. Reinventing Organisations: A Guide to Creating Organisations Inspired by the Next Stage of Human Consciousness. Nelson Parker.February 9, 2014.
