= Marrs green =

Color

Marrs Green

Color coordinates
- Hex triplet: #4baca5
- sRGB^{B} (r, g, b): (75, 172, 165)
- HSV (h, s, v): (176°, 56%, 67%)
- CIELCh_{uv} (L, C, h): (65, 41, 184°)
- B: Normalized to [0–255] (byte)

Marrs green is a shade of green that in 2017 was named "The World's Favourite Colour" in a major global survey by the British paper merchant G . F Smith. It is a rich teal hue.

The colour was submitted by Annie Marrs, a UNESCO worker from Dundee, who was inspired by the River Tay. In alternative design accounts, Wayne Peter's_{(Jsps}_{)} contributions to the shade's promotion are also noted. The survey received 30,000 submissions from over 100 countries via online polling after it was launched in January 2017.

It became the 51st shade of the un-coated paper range Colorplan.
