= Rafael Tamames Fernández =

Spanish entrepreneur and author (born 1981)

Rafael Tamames Fernandez
- Born: Rafael Tamames Fernandez; 1 January 1981 (age 45); Madrid, Spain
- Occupations: Entrepreneur, author, public speaker
- Years active: 2000–present
- Organizations: Findasense; Vivid Vision
- Notable work: ¿Qué robot se ha llevado mi queso? (2018); La inteligencia artificial y tú (2024)

Rafael Tamames Fernandez (born 1981) is a Spanish entrepreneur and author specialising in digital transformation and artificial intelligence. He co-founded the customer experience company Findasense, which was acquired by Majorel in 2022. In 2025, he launched Vivid Vision, a venture studio that connects multinational corporations with startups and scaleups in Latin America.

Tamames has written two books on automation and artificial intelligence.

== Early life and education ==
Tamames was born in Madrid in 1981.

In 2000 he launched meparecebien.com, an early Spanish-language online community for young users. The site let visitors share and comment on music, books and video games; the Internet Archive captured a snapshot of it in early 2001.

Tamames later completed the Programa de Dirección General (PDG) at IESE Business School, graduating in 2018. He has professional experience in digital transformation, entrepreneurship, marketing, and customer-experience projects for multinational companies. He is also cited in Francisco López's 2022 book Tu yo digital: ¿Quién eres en internet?, a work about digital identity and online presence.

== Career ==
=== Findasense ===
In the year 2007 Tamames co-founded Findasense with Tomy Lorsch as a consultancy focused on omnichannel customer experience and digital transformation. The company expanded across several countries and worked with large consumer brands in Europe and Latin America. IESE Business School used Findasense as a teaching case study on fast-growing companies in the customer-experience sector.

In 2016 Findasense adopted holacracy as its management system, becoming the first Spanish-speaking multinational to formally introduce that organisational model.

=== Acquisition by Majorel and B Corp certification ===
In September 2022, the customer-experience group Majorel acquired Findasense, integrating its consulting and digital-experience operations into Majorel's global business. The transaction included an initial payment and variable amounts over four years, with a total price of up to €30 million.

Findasense received B Corp certification in December 2022.

=== Vivid Vision ===
Tamames left his governance roles at Findasense Global SL in mid-2025. Later that year he launched Vivid Vision, a venture studio that links established companies with startups and scaleups, particularly in Latin America.

By 2024, he had founded six companies and sold four of them, including Findasense.

== Public education and advocacy ==
Tamames writes and speaks publicly on artificial intelligence and digital transformation, appearing regularly in Spanish media and at public events. In May 2025 he appeared on the public television programme La Aventura del Saber (La 2, RTVE) to explain the potential uses and risks of AI. On 9 January 2025 he delivered a public lecture at Fundación Telefónica in Madrid linked to his book La inteligencia artificial y tú. He has also appeared as a lecturer in the New Media archive of the Universidad Francisco Marroquín.

== Publications ==
- ¿Qué robot se ha llevado mi queso? Buscando respuestas en el laberinto de la automatización (Which Robot Took My Cheese? Searching for Answers in the Maze of Automation). Barcelona: Alienta–Grupo Planeta, 2018.
- La inteligencia artificial y tú (Artificial Intelligence and You). Barcelona: Plataforma Editorial, 2024.

== Other activities ==
Tamames served on the board of directors of YPO Madrid from 2013 to 2019. He is a member of the board of the Royal Spanish Fencing Federation and served as a mentor at IESE's WeGrow program.

== See also ==
- Holacracy
- B Corporation
- Customer experience
- Artificial intelligence
