= Seweryn Chajtman =

- Born: 5 August 1919; Warsaw, Poland
- Died: 20 August 2012 (aged 93); Warsaw, Poland
- Resting place: Warsaw Jewish Cemetery
- Citizenship: Polish
- Education: Moscow Engineering and Economics Institute, Warsaw University of Technology
- Known for: systematic variations organization of production processes, evolution of the structure of production systems, criteria for the analysis, design and improvement of management structures, methodology and criteria for determining the production capacity and reserves of the company, manufacturing specialization criteria in relation to the phenomena of cooperation, calculation methodology for the rhythmic production, systematics efficiency factors, concept and methodology of the economic system multi-dimensional treatment, three sequential process interpretation
- Spouse: Janina Dusik-Chajtman
- Awards: Commander's Cross of the Order of Rebirth of Poland (Polonia Restituta)
- Scientific career
- Fields: organization and management in the industry (Industrial organization), theory of information processes of economic systems
- Thesis: Prospects for the development and improvement of the organization of unique heavy machinery building in Poland (1952)
- Doctoral advisor: Edvard Satel

Seweryn Chajtman [sɛˈvɛrɨn ˈxajtman] (5 August 1919 in Warsaw – 20 August 2012 there) – a Polish scientist (PhD, Professor), engineer, teacher of organization and management in the industry (Industrial Management), pioneered Computer Science in Poland. Creator of the Alternative Theory of Organization and Management.

== Biography ==
After high school he studied at the State Higher School of Mechanical and Electrical Engineering founded by Hyppolite Wawelberg and Stanislaw Rotwand. In the study undertook a job as a machinist and an intern at repair workshops Piotrkowska Manufactory in Piotrkow (1937) and at the Roundhouse Warsaw-West Railway Station (1938). In addition, casual earned as a draftsman, designer and installer. In July 1939, graduated from the Faculty of Mechanical Engineering of the State Higher School of Mechanical and Electrical Engineering (workshop and machine tool section). During his studies he was a member of the Socialist Youth Organization "Life" (up to 1938). Since February 1939 he worked for a printing machine factory in Warsaw as a designer and manager of the workshop.

In autumn 1939, enter illegally into the area of Soviet Union. Since December 1939 he worked in the Roundhouse Lviv-East as repairs and reconstruction of steam locomotives technical supervisor. From October 1940 to June 1941 he worked at the county Board of Quarry as a boilers supervising and devices repairs engineer and designer of stone processing. After Nazi Germany's attack on the Soviet Union was evacuated with the processing plant and sent to work in the Central Workshop of the Board Engineering in the south-western Russia on the Volga, where he worked as a design engineer, technologist, foreman and shift manager in the department of mechanical and assembly.

In May 1942 drafted into the Red Army as a weapons engineer. He was on the front lines: the Voronezh Front, the Volkhov Front, near Sinyavino, the Leningrad Front and at the Velikiye Luki. Seriously wounded during the offensive in the area of Velikiye Luki (location) - Nevel (location). After treatment in hospitals was employed at the tools factory in Moscow (November 1943) as a manager of repairs tools and technologist and designer in the experimental department of the machine tool. He worked there until 1948.

In the meantime, in order to supplement the specialization began (1945) individual studies at the Moscow Engineering and Economics Institute (MEEI), where he studied economics and organizational issues in the engineering industry (without interrupting work in a factory tools). In June 1947 obtained a master's degree in engineering and economics at the Faculty of Machine Building. He was then admitted to postgraduate studies in the Department of Organization and Economics of Machine Building Enterprises of the same Institute.

In May 1949 he returned to Poland for a few months. He was sent to the Department of Production and Technology of the Ministry of Heavy Industry. In February 1950 he went back to Moscow to complete his doctoral studies. Since March 1950 he continued his doctoral studies. At the same time, he was employed as a technical consultant in the Office of the Commercial Counsellor Embassy of the People's Republic in Moscow, where he was sent by the Ministry of Heavy Industry. In April 1952 he defended his doctoral dissertation on the prospects for the development and improvement of the organization of unique heavy machinery building. During his studies at MEEI led classes and took part in the research work on solving problems and implementing improvements in industrial organization, including car plants called ZIS. He also participated in a fairly famous work on the comprehensive reorganization of plants called "Caliber" (Russian: Калибр).

In May 1952 finally returned to Poland and became operational in Warsaw University of Technology as an assistant professor, while continuing to work at the Ministry of Machine-Building Industry. He also lectures on the organization and degree work at masters and doctoral courses at the Main School of Planning and Statistics (at present: Warsaw School of Economics).

He has organized and launched the first in Poland engineering and economic studies (1952) at Warsaw University of Technology. As a result, the Department of Engineering and Economics was established at the Faculty of Mechanical Engineering (at present: Faculty of Production Engineering) and the Department of Organization, Economics and Planning in the Machine Building Industry (OE, which led to the 1968. Engineering and economic studies educated specialists in the organization of production. Studies were created in the following varieties: 1) MSc evening courses for experienced engineers with prior work experience, 2) version of the uniform 5-year study (since 1954), 3) weekend and extramural studies version (after 1960), 4) in the form post-MSc study in the field of data processing and applications of digital computers (since 1965). Studies were based on the system design and students' own work, based on organizational laboratories, in close collaboration with industrial plants. After 1955 these studies have gained prominence and recognition in the industry.

While working in the Ministry of Machine Industry is mainly occupied (1952-1953) to develop the concept of operations, preparation and running conditions of the Institute of Machine Industry Organization "Orgmasz" (at present: Institute of Organization and Management in Industry "Orgmasz"), which was launched at the end of 1953.

In May 1953 he was sent to the Scientific Personnel Education Institute at the Central Committee of the Polish United Workers' Party as a team manager at the Department of Industrial Economics. These obligations he was to solve the Institute in 1956.

During his research work in the Soviet Union he became knowledgeable of the works of Leonid Kantorovich (who became later a Nobel Prize winner in 1975) including theory published in 1939. Despite this theory being abandoned in the USSR under Stalin, he included operations research elements in his lectures in the Department of Organization, Economics and Planning in the Machine Building Industry. He initiated the first lectures in computer science in the Faculty of Production Engineering of Warsaw University of Technology, as well as Poland's first lectures in the field of computer applications.

In 1963 he spent several months in a research internship in the United States, during which visited several universities and industrial plants, and established contacts with leading American theorists and practitioners in the field industrial engineering. After returning from the USA he created a laboratory equipped with counting and perforating Hollerith machines, accounting and billing equipment, equipment for standardization work, psychological test instruments, equipment for production planning and a then state-of-the-art UMC-1 computer. From 1957 to 1962 he was half full-time researcher at the Institute of Machine Industry Organization "Orgmasz". In 1965 he received the title of Professor in the field of economics. In the period 1958-1969 he was the promoter of 14 defended doctoral dissertations.

As a result of the political crisis in March 1968 removed from scientific, teaching and administration activities in the Department of Organization, Economics and Planning in the Machine Building Industry. He was also prevented from continuing occupation, removed from the research councils, committees, etc., laboratories have been physically removed. He could also find employment in the Institute of Machine Industry Organization "Orgmasz" and other academic institutions, research or industrial, with the exception of the Department of Praxeology of Polish Academy of Sciences. In 1975, "removed from the status of a personnel" in the Warsaw University of Technology. In the same year he was sent to the two institutes of the Polish Academy of Sciences, however, was not there to begin substantive work. In the years 1969-1971 as a result of efforts of Professor Tadeusz Kotarbinski and Professor Jan Zieleniewski he worked closely with the Department of Praxiology (Polish Academy of Sciences), leading the study team on the dynamics of labor productivity, intensity and qualification work in certain sectors, and on the formalization of the structure of production processes.

In 1976, he was sent to the Institute of Machine Industry Organization "Orgmasz", where until 1992 headed the scientific research teams. Its main activity was the execution of orders of industrial enterprises in the design improvement of the organization. This allowed the research and development of ideas generated in previous periods.

In February 1990 he received from the then Rector of Warsaw University of Technology Professor Mark Roman letter and accompanying Senate resolution. The letter included the statement that "[...] without any reasonable grounds and undeserved [...] reason [...] deprived of Professor opportunities for teaching and research work [...] dismissal of Warsaw University of Technology [...] was very hurtful and disgraceful".

In 1999 he was awarded by the President Aleksander Kwaśniewski of the Commander's Cross of the Order of Rebirth of Poland (Polonia Restituta) for outstanding achievements in teaching and scientific work and for his contribution to the development of the national economy. In 2003 he received the title of Merit for the Technical University of Warsaw.

He was a member of the Organization and Management Sciences Committee of the Polish Academy of Sciences, the Scientific Society for Organization and Management, Association of the Polish Mechanical Engineers and Technicians.

He was buried on 23 August 2012 at the Warsaw Warsaw Jewish Cemetery.

== Bibliography ==
- Gackowski, Z.; Targowski, A.; Zyzik, M. (23 August 2012). "Funeral Speech of Chajtman's students" (PDF) (in Polish). Archived from the original (PDF) on 6 September 2012.
- Targowski, A. (2001). Informatyka bez złudzeń – wspomnienia (PDF) (in Polish). Toruń: Wydawnictwo Adam Marszalek. ISBN 83-7174-795-0.
- "Część 1: Biogramy A–Mać". Who is who w Polsce (in Polish) (2 ed.). Zug, Schweiz: Who is Who Verlag für Personenenzyklopädien AG. 2003. p. 490.
