= Teleperformance =

Multinational France-based omnichannel outsourcer

TP

- TP headquarters in Paris, France
- Trade name: TP
- Type: Societas Europaea
- Traded as: Euronext Paris: TEP; CAC Next 20 component
- ISIN: FR0000051807
- Industry: Business process outsourcing
- Founded: 1978; 48 years ago in France
- Founder: Daniel Julien
- Headquarters: 48.8754°N 2.3023°E, Paris, Île-de-France, France
- Area served: Worldwide
- Key people: Moulay Hafid Elalamy (Chairman); Jorge Amar (CEO); Daniel Julien (Founder); Agustin Grisanti (CEO EMEA)
- Services: Call center; Outsourcing; Customer care; Sales; Technical support; Debt collection
- Revenue: ▲€10.28 billion (2024)
- Operating income: ▲€1.082 billion (2024)
- Net income: ▼€523 million (2024)
- Number of employees: ▲490,000 (2024)
- Website: tp.com

TP, formerly Teleperformance, is a French multinational business process outsourcing company founded in 1978 with headquarters in France. It provides services for debt collection, telemarketing, customer relationship management, content moderation, and communication.

== History ==
Daniel Julien created Teleperformance in June 1978, in Paris. In 1986, TP established international subsidiaries in Belgium and Italy. Two years later, TP expanded into Spain, Germany, Sweden and the United Kingdom.

Rochefortaise Communication merged with Teleperformance International in 1999 to form S.R. ance. This company became Teleperformance in 2006, and shortened its name to TP in 2025.

In 1992, TP USA was established, and Asia-Pacific contact centers were set up in the Philippines and Singapore in 1996. The Group expanded in Europe through numerous acquisitions and subsidiaries in Switzerland, Norway, Denmark, Greece, Spain, the Netherlands and Finland. From 1998 through 2002, the TP network expanded into Argentina, Brazil and Mexico.

TP USA purchased AOL's 400-employee call center in Ogden, Utah, in 2006.

In 2007, TP acquired a 100% interest in Twenty4help, a European technical support company, and AllianceOne, a US-based accounts receivable management company. In 2008, the group's operations and strategy were centralized under the responsibility of Daniel Julien and Jacques Berrebi. The same year, TP acquired The Answer Group.

In 2010, TP acquired Scottish outsourcing call center beCogent for £35 million. It ceased operations in December 2021 mainly due to the impact of the COVID-19 pandemic and remote work. By 2013 TP had six contact centers in Tunisia. In 2013, TP acquired full control of TLS Contact. In 2014, TP acquired Aegis USA Inc., an outsourcing and technology company in the United States, the Philippines and Costa Rica.

In August 2016, TP purchased California-based LanguageLine Solutions LLC for $1.52 billion from a private equity firm Abry Partners.

TP secured multiple United Kingdom government and NHS contracts to operate support services for the public during the COVID-19 pandemic. In 2020, TP launched TP Cloud Campus in Portugal, with mobile cloud-enabled workstations for virtual onboarding, training, and employee meetings. There are currently cloud campus hubs in the Philippines and Mexico.

In January 2024, TP completed the acquisition of Majorel, acquiring 99% of the company's shares from Bertelsmann and Moroccan real estate company Saham, in exchange for 3 billion euros and a 4% stake in TP. This led to the launch of TP's digital consulting arm, TP Infinity, the same month.

TP announced a partnership with Sanas, a provider of software that uses AI to adjust a speaker's accent in real-time, in February 2025. TP also made an equity investment of approximately $13 million in Sanas.

TP and Carnegie Mellon University announced a partnership in March 2025 to accelerate AI applied research.

In June 2025, TP purchased Vancouver-based AI crowdsourcing platform Agents Only. The company also launched TP.ai, an AI orchestration platform.

== Corporate affairs ==
=== Business trends ===
The key trends for TP are (as of the financial year ending 31 December):

FY	Revenue (€ bn)	Net profit (€ m)	Total assets (€ bn)	Employees (k)
2012	2.3	128	1.9	137
2013	2.4	129	1.8	148
2014	2.7	150	2.9	181
2015	3.3	200	3.0	188
2016	3.6	214	4.9	216
2017	4.1	312	4.4	223
2018	4.4	312	5.8	306
2019	5.3	400	6.8	331
2020	5.7	324	7.0	383
2021	7.1	557	8.3	418
2022	8.1	645	8.8	418
2023	8.3	602	11.8	418
2024	10.2	523	12.0	420

=== Governance ===
Jacques Berrebi ended all operational duties in January 2009 and returned in 2012, at the age of 70. Co-founder Daniel Julien remained as chairman of the board, and Paulo César Salles Vasques was announced as the new chief executive officer of the group.

Following Vasques' resignation in October 2017, Julien was appointed as group chief executive officer by the board of directors. In June 2023, Bhupender Singh was appointed as TP Group Deputy Chief Executive Officer. In August 2024, Olivier Rigaudy, Agustin Grisanti and Scott Klein were appointed as deputy CEOs, and when Singh departed in October 2024, his role was assumed by Thomas Mackenbrock.

In March 2026, founder and CEO Daniel Julien stepped down from his executive role and transitioned to the position of Strategic Advisor to the Chairman & CEO. Deputy CEO Thomas Mackenbrock and Deputy CEO of Finance Olivier Rigaudy also stepped down from their executive roles. Benoît Gabelle, currently Deputy CFO, was appointed interim Chief Financial Officer. Jorge Amar, a global expert in AI-native customer operations at scale, was appointed Group Chief Executive Officer.

=== Corporate social responsibility ===
TP's Citizen of the World program helped relocate and build homes for the victims of the Typhoon Ketsana in 2009. Since 2006, Citizen of the World has made $60 million in donations to assist vulnerable populations in 50 countries.

TP partnered with One Tree Planted in 2022, funding the plantation of 500,000 trees across Europe, Asia, and the Americas. Also in 2022, TP entered a partnership with the Negros Occidental provincial government, to give priority to Negros Occidental Language Information Technology Center graduates in job applications.

Since 2022, TP has partnered with UNICEF to help protect and advance children’s rights, with a focus on quality education in areas most in need, like Brazil, Ghana, and the Philippines. TP also supports UNICEF’s Global Humanitarian Thematic Fund, contributing to emergency responses in countries and regions including Sudan, Ukraine, Syria, Türkiye, Nigeria, and Latin America and the Caribbean.

== Awards ==
- 2023 - Fortune 100 Best Companies to Work For
- 2023 - Bronze Stevie Award for Innovation in Customer Service
- 2024 - GlobalCapital's French Deal of the Year Award
- 2024 - Golden Bridge Globee Gold Award - Technology Services
- 2024 - Certified Great Place to Work - USA
- 2025 - Fortune World's Best Workplaces™

== Controversies ==
In 2008 a class action lawsuit was filed against Salt Lake City-based Teleperformance USA seeking unpaid wages for employees, alleging a violation of the Fair Labor Standards Act. On 19 May 2010, a settlement was reached for approximately $2 million to be paid to 15,862 workers in 10 US states. Instead of an out of court settlement, TP lost a similar case in the Netherlands Supreme Court and the Court of Appeal in The Hague.

A group of labor unions filed a complaint documenting unsafe working conditions, monitoring, surveillance, union busting and retaliation against employees in ten countries in April 2020. Due to COVID-19 restrictions, workers in the Philippines, including those supporting Amazon's Ring camera contract, had to sleep at their work spaces and were unable to meet social distancing requirements. The Financial Times was able to verify this, including in a Cebu City office. After the working conditions were made public, the company promised to make improvements, but NBC News reported after six months the company was providing intermittent shuttle service, not properly sanitizing working spaces, and sending workers home without pay if they were quarantined.

In 2021, TP employees who work from home were sent contract addendums that would allow monitoring by AI-powered cameras to ensure compliance with security policies and to spot check for home-working infractions. As of August that year, the remote monitoring had been rolled out to India, Mexico, and the Philippines. UK employees were told remote scans would not be used for them, and Albania ruled out the use of webcams through their Data Protection Commission. An Apple spokesperson reported Apple "prohibits the use of video or photographic monitoring by our suppliers and have confirmed TP does not use video monitoring for any of their teams working with Apple."

Uber reported that it requested the following audit logs for its workers: monitoring to verify that only a hired employee is accessing data; that outsourced staff were not recording screen data on another device; and that no unauthorized person was near the computer. An Amazon spokesperson reported Amazon did not request additional monitoring for at-home workers.

In Colombia, the union Utraclaro, affiliated to UNI Global Union, has organized TP Colombia employees, including moderators. In 2021, after the union submitted its demands for the company to protect freedom of association, TP filed a lawsuit against the union in a labor court, alleging Ultraclaro did not follow proper processes when ratifying its bargaining demands. In November 2022, the Ministry of Labour launched an investigation into the company. After the announcement of the investigation, shares in the company dropped by 34%. In December 2022, the subsidiary received independent certification from Bureau Veritas on the "use and inclusion of the international standard ISO 26000 in the field of social responsibility within its operations in Colombia."

In April and May 2023, the company signed a global framework agreement enabling workers in Colombia, Romania and Poland to unionize. The Ministry of Labor later closed their investigation into TP, without any findings against the company.

In February 2024, TP received a certificate for diversity and inclusion management in Colombia from AENOR.

=== Content moderation ===
TP employs content moderators for platforms including TikTok, with moderators in Tunisia and Colombia, reviewing explicit content to remove it from the platform. Its "Trust and Safety" branch and moderation program were launched in 2019. After an investigation by Forbes reported the company retained explicit material, TP and TikTok were criticized by the United States Senate Committee on Commerce and by shareholders. In November 2022, the company announced that it would exit "the highly egregious part of the trust and safety business." However, it reversed its decision in March 2023. In 2025, the company is discovered to operate content moderation for Meta in the Ghanaian capital of Accra, which faced criticism for poor working conditions, low pay, and mental health affects on moderators.

Following the announcement, UNI Global Union released a statement, stating "we believe that TP's decision to re-enter full-service content moderation is a positive step."
