= Teal =

Greenish-blue color

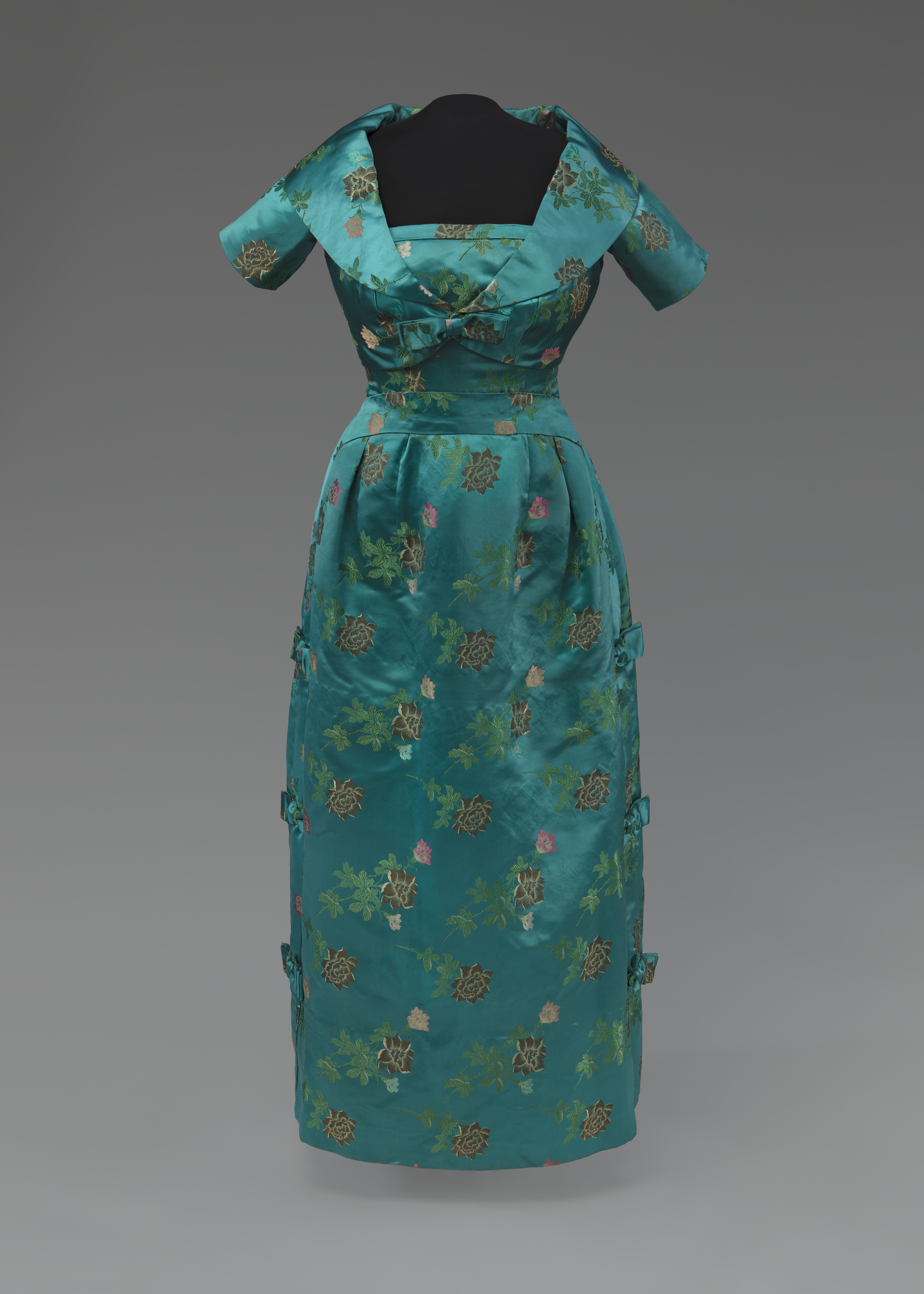
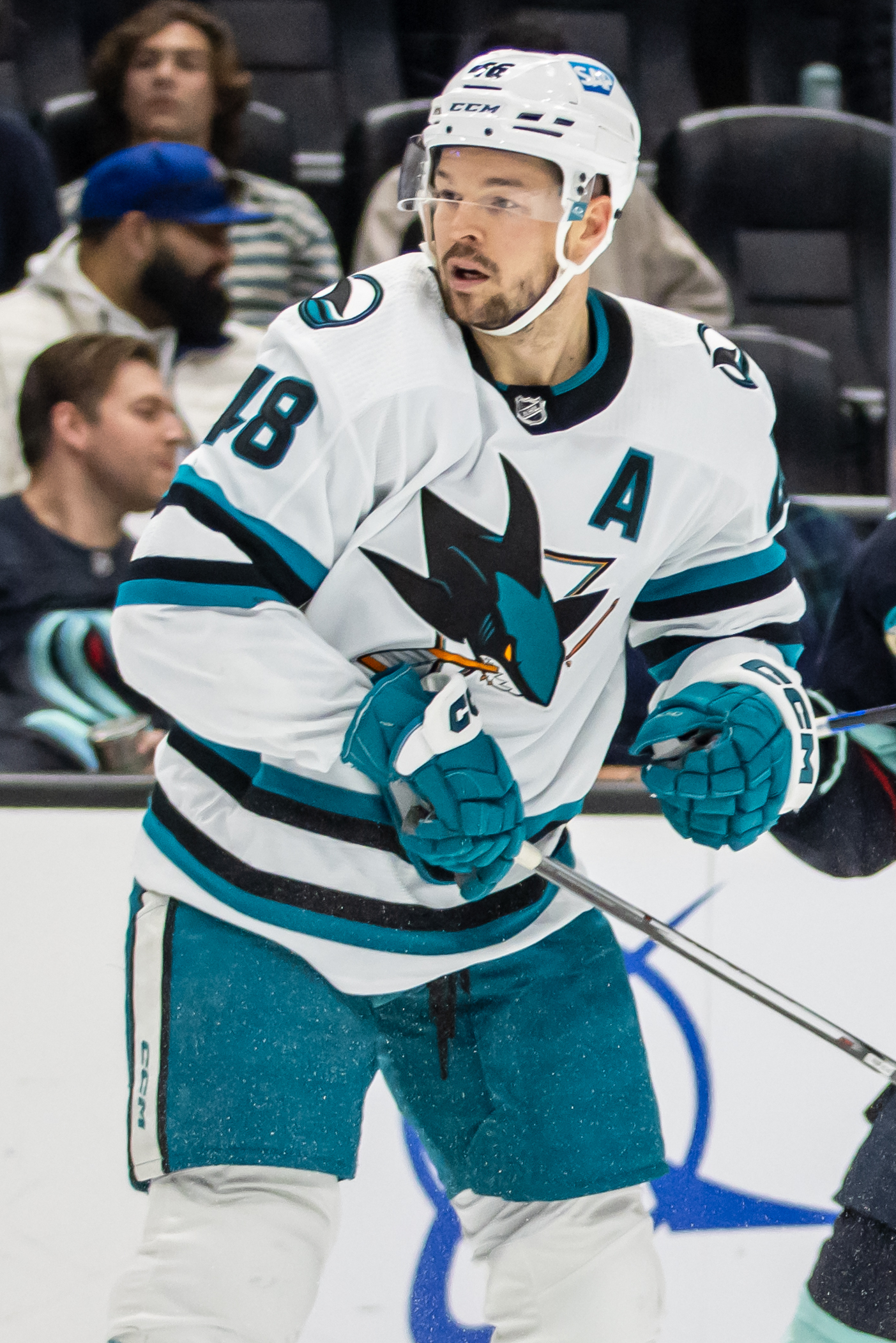
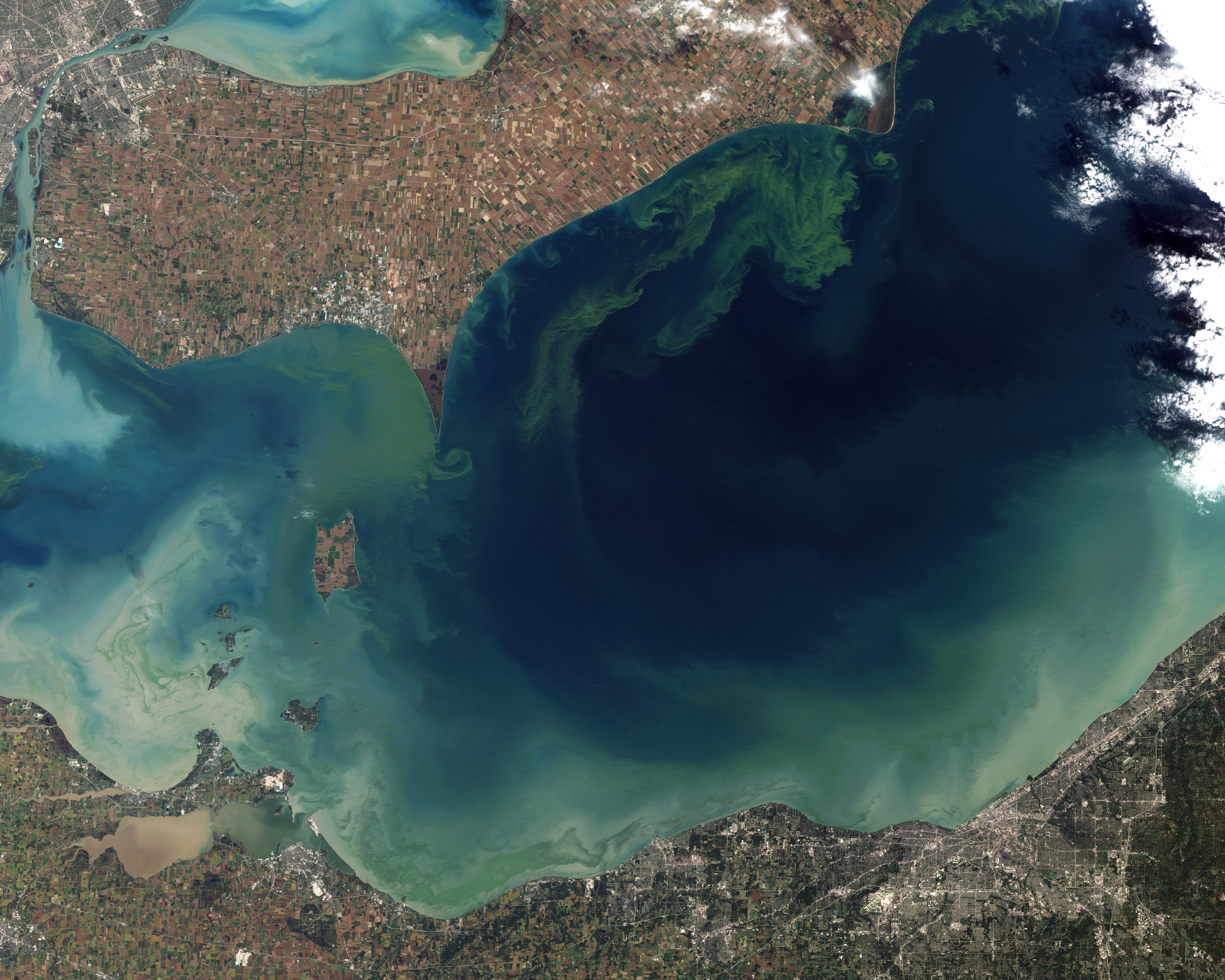
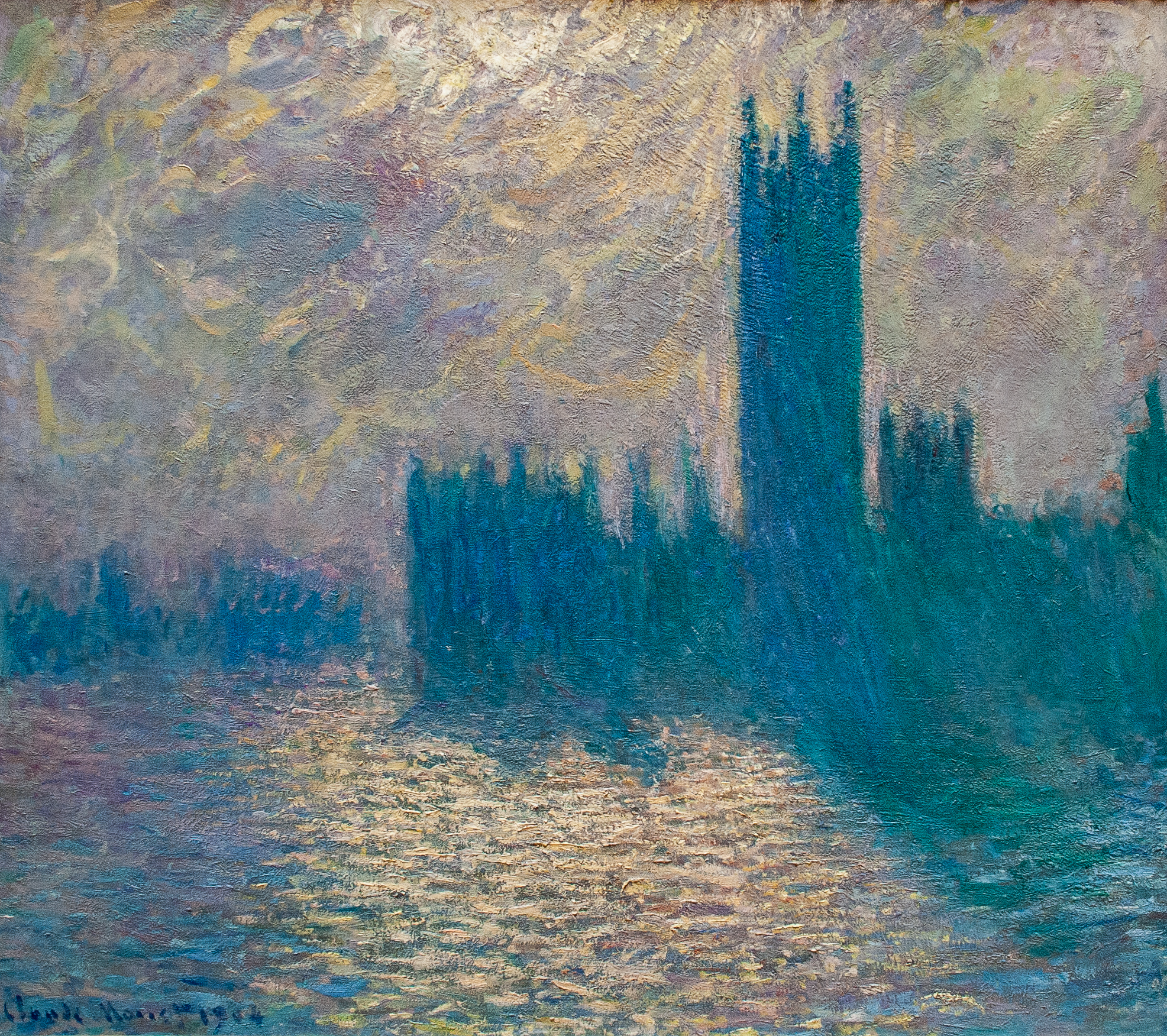
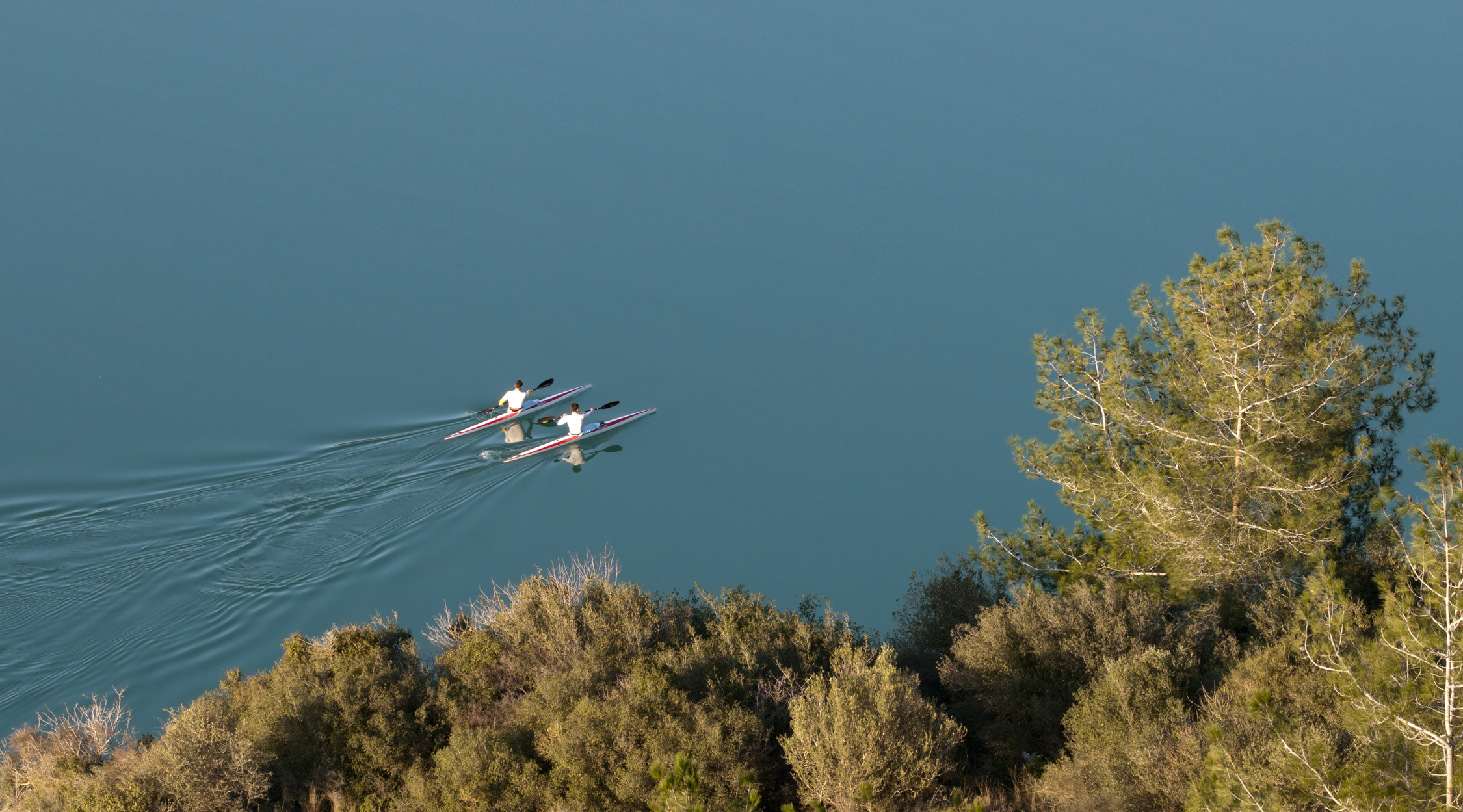
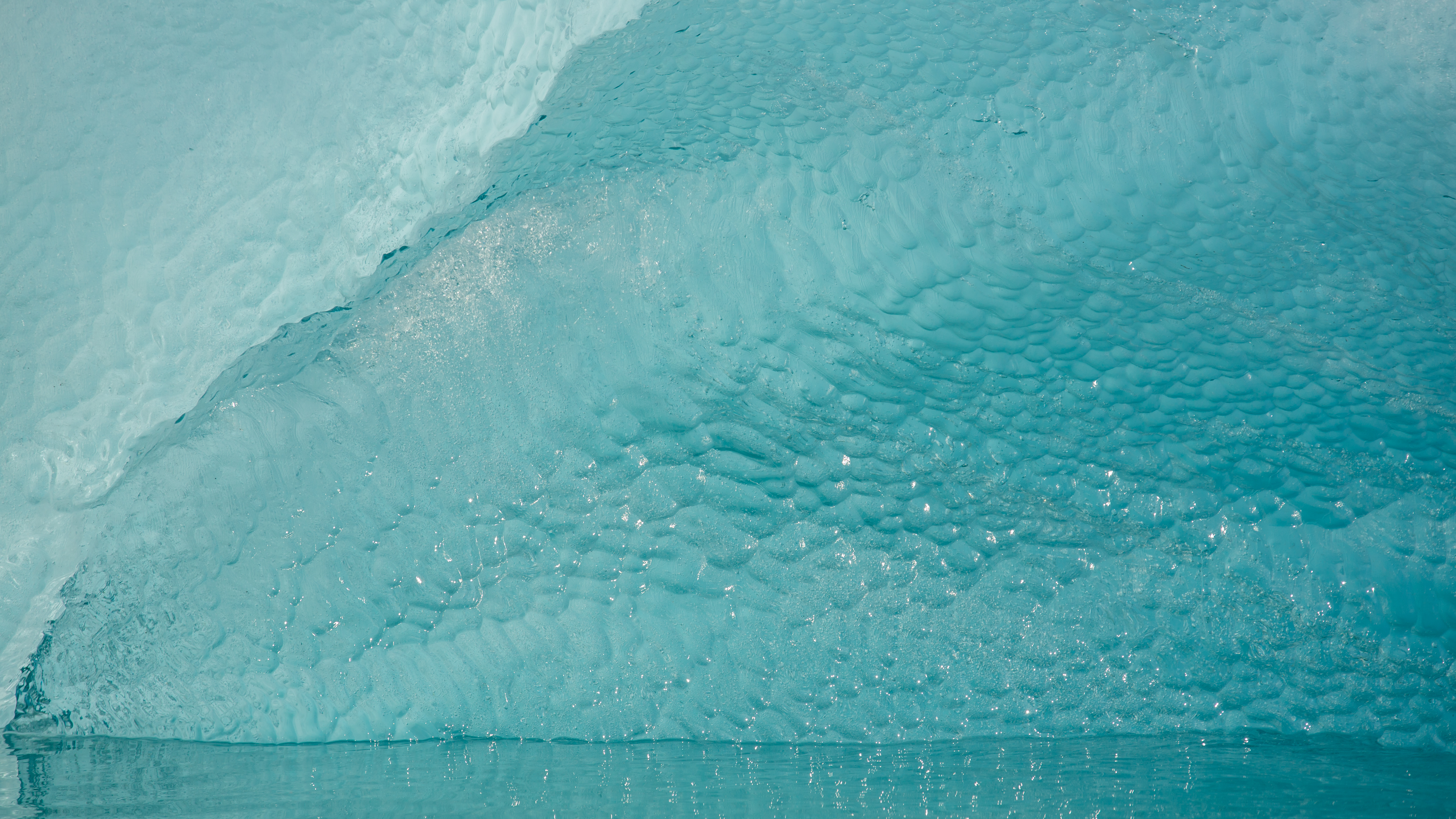
- Clockwise, from top left: Dress designed by Ann Lowe; Tomáš Hertl playing for the San Jose Sharks; Houses of Parliament, stormy sky by Claude Monet; An iceberg in Svalbard; Canoes on Seyhan Dam; Algal bloom in Lake Erie.

Color coordinates
- Hex triplet: #008080
- sRGB^{B} (r, g, b): (0, 128, 128)
- HSV (h, s, v): (180°, 100%, 50%)
- CIELCh_{uv} (L, C, h): (48, 38, 192°)
- Source: HTML/CSS
- ISCC–NBS descriptor: Moderate bluish green
- B: Normalized to [0–255] (byte)

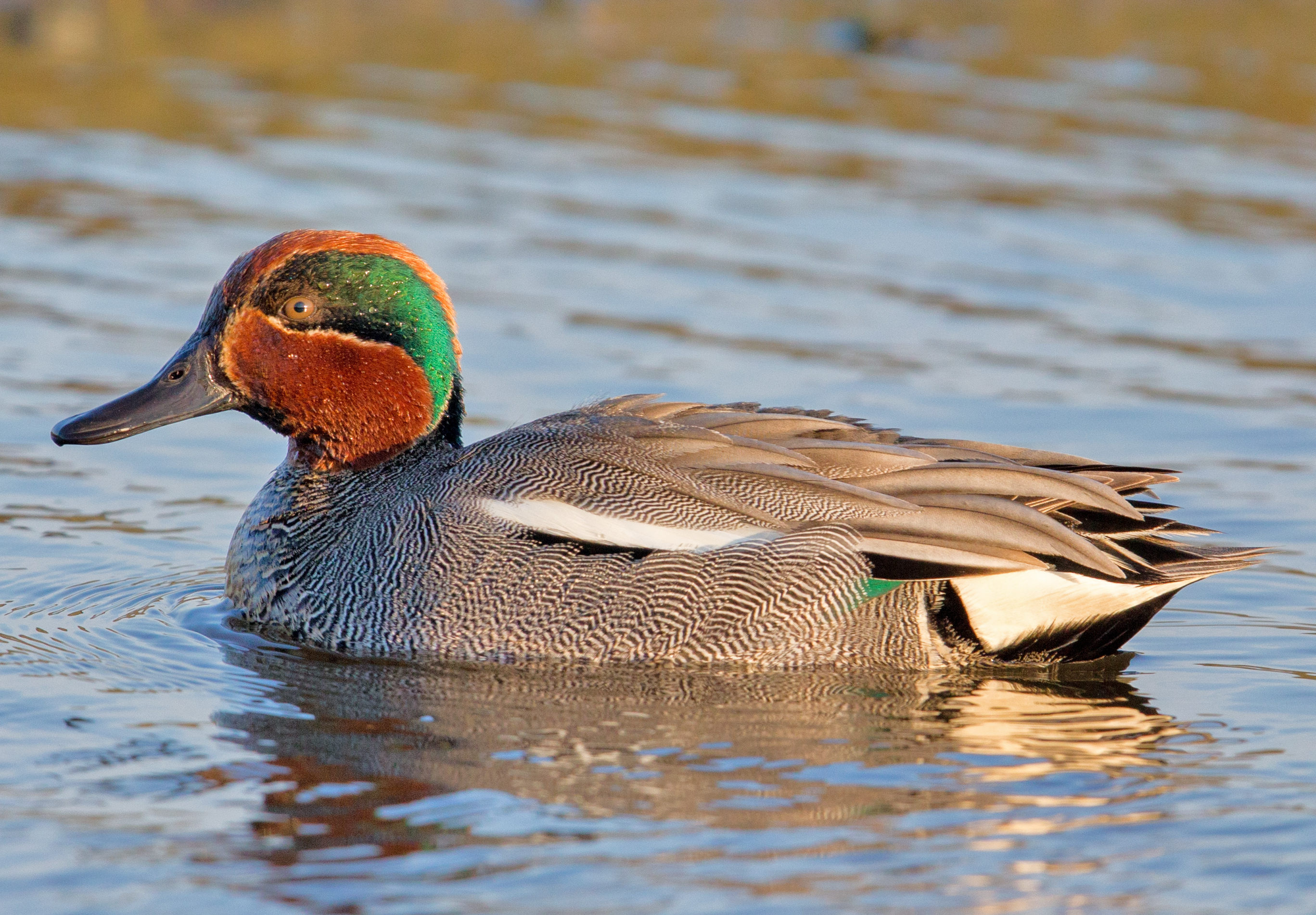
A male Eurasian teal, showing the iridescent blue-green stripe on the head

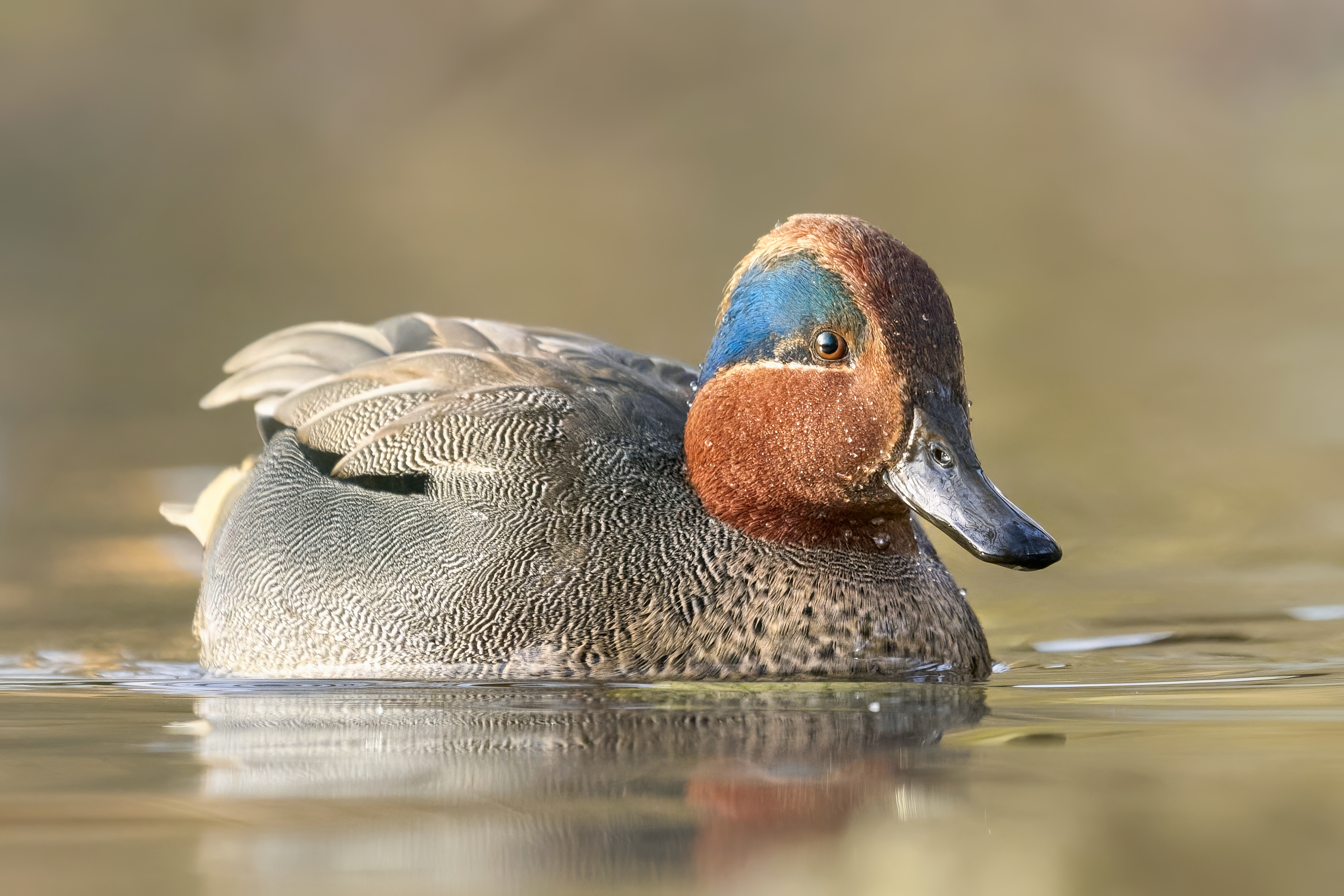
As the color in the teal's head is a structural color, its exact color as perceived by the human eye varies with the angle of light incidence

The flag of Sri Lanka uses teal.

Teal is a dark cyan color. Its name comes from that of a bird, the Eurasian teal (Anas crecca) which has a similarly colored stripe on its head. The word is often used colloquially to refer to shades of cyan in general.

It can be created by mixing cyan with black or gray. It is also one of the first group of 16 HTML/CSS web colors. In the RGB model used to create colors on computer screens and televisions, teal is created by reducing the brightness of cyan to about one half.

In North America, teal became a fad color during the 1990s, with many sports teams adopting it for their uniforms.

== Etymology ==
The first recorded use of teal as a color name in English was in 1917. The term teal (referring to a species of duck) is derived from the Middle English tele, a word akin to the Dutch taling and the Middle Low German telink.

== Variations ==
=== Teal blue ===
Teal blue

Color coordinates
- Hex triplet: #367588
- sRGB^{B} (r, g, b): (54, 117, 136)
- HSV (h, s, v): (194°, 60%, 53%)
- CIELCh_{uv} (L, C, h): (46, 34, 220°)
- Source: Kelly & Judd (1976)
- ISCC–NBS descriptor: Moderate greenish blue
- B: Normalized to [0–255] (byte)

Teal blue is a medium tone of teal with more blue. The first recorded use of teal blue as a colour name in English was in 1927.

The source of this colour is the Plochere Color System, a colour system formulated in 1948 that is widely used by interior designers. Teal was subsequently a heavily used colour in the 1950s and 1960s.

Teal blue is also the name of a Crayola crayon colour (colour #113) from 1990 to 2003.

=== Teal green ===
Teal green

Color coordinates
- Hex triplet: #264B56
- sRGB^{B} (r, g, b): (38, 75, 86)
- HSV (h, s, v): (194°, 56%, 34%)
- CIELCh_{uv} (L, C, h): (30, 19, 218°)
- Source: Kelly & Judd (1976)
- ISCC–NBS descriptor: Moderate greenish blue
- B: Normalized to [0–255] (byte)

Teal green is a darker shade of teal with more green. It is a variable color averaging a dark bluish-green that is green, darker, and stronger than invisible green or pine tree.

Teal green is most closely related to the Crayola crayon color Deep Space Sparkle.

=== Deep sea green ===
Deep sea green

Color coordinates
- Hex triplet: #255456
- sRGB^{B} (r, g, b): (37, 84, 86)
- HSV (h, s, v): (182°, 57%, 34%)
- CIELCh_{uv} (L, C, h): (33, 20, 197°)
- Source: Benjamin Moore
- B: Normalized to [0–255] (byte)

Deep sea green is one of the paint colours manufactured and marketed by American paint company Benjamin Moore.

== In culture ==
=== Aviation ===
TEAL is the acronym for Tasman Empire Airways Limited, the forerunner of Air New Zealand, who used teal as their airline's signature color; it appeared not just on plane livery but promotional material and airline bags. When New Zealanders refer to "teal green", they are more likely referring to the airline color than the bird's color.

=== Rapid transit ===
Teal is the official color of Kochi Metro, the rapid transit system serving the city of Kochi in India.

=== Flags ===
- The flag of Mozambique contains a greenish-teal horizontal stripe.
- The teal stripe in the flag of Sri Lanka represents Sri Lankan Muslims.

=== Business ===
A teal organisation is an emerging organisational paradigm.

=== Military ===
Armies that used feldgrau, cadet gray and similar shades of grayish green for field uniforms in the late 19th and early 20th century commonly used more saturated color for officers, often tending on teal. The armed forces of the Netherlands used teal field uniforms up to the Second World War. Some of the modern parade uniforms of the Russian Armed Forces are also teal, though named "wave-green" in the service.

=== Sports ===
- Teal is the jersey color of the Belfast Giants ice hockey team. The color was chosen to be a neutral color in the often heated sporting environments of Belfast.
- The Port Adelaide Football Club in the Australian Football League feature teal in their team colors.
- In the NBA:
  - Teal is worn by the Charlotte Hornets.
  - The Detroit Pistons NBA team wore teal as part of their uniforms from the 1996–97 to 2000–01 seasons.
- In the NFL:
  - The Jacksonville Jaguars use teal as one of their primary colors.
  - The Miami Dolphins use a variation called Aqua as their primary color.
  - The Philadelphia Eagles also use a variation called Midnight Green.
- In Major League Baseball:
  - The Seattle Mariners use a variant known as "Northwest Green" as one of their primary colors.
  - The Arizona Diamondbacks use teal as an alternate color.
- In the National Hockey League:
  - The San Jose Sharks use a variation called Deep Pacific Teal as their primary color.
  - The Mighty Ducks of Anaheim used a variation of teal known as Jade as a primary color until 2006 when the team was rebranded to the Anaheim Ducks. The color is still used today on the team's alternate uniform.
- The Penrith Panthers of the Australian National Rugby League used in the early 2000s teal as a secondary color.
- The Griquas of South Africa's Currie Cup use teal as primary color (although it is officially defined as peacock blue).

=== Foods ===
Gummy bears are commonly teal. Mountain Dew's Baja Blast flavor is colored teal.

=== Social and political ===
Teal represents intersectionality of those who reflect on equality and social justice for all marginalized groups and misunderstood groups such as women, LGBTQ+, people of color, the homeless, persons with mental illness (e.g., PTSD, depression), the poor and other groups that go under represented or devalued in the US.

=== Computing ===
- Windows 95 features a teal-colored default wallpaper.

=== Film ===
The "orange and teal look" is a trend in 21st-century filmmaking, in which scenes are color-graded to emphasize these two complementary colors.

=== TV series ===
- Perry the Platypus, one of the main characters in the TV series Phineas and Ferb, is teal.
- Ash Ketchum, the main character on Pokémon, wears a dark teal T-shirt during the earlier seasons.
- Martha Jones, a companion of the Tenth Doctor in Doctor Who, wears a teal T-shirt on her debut, "Smith and Jones".
- The wives of Commanders in The Handmaid's Tale wear teal.
- In Our Flag Means Death, when asked their favourite color, the character Jim Jimenez replies "teal".
- Characters in the South Korean television series Squid Game wear teal tracksuits as their game uniform.

=== Religion ===
The Hermit Intercessors of the Lamb, a Christian contemplation group in the state of Nebraska, wears habits with a teal scapular to symbolize intercession between heaven (blue) and earth. Originally organised as a Roman Catholic association, it was suppressed in 2010 by the Archbishop of Omaha, who directed members to cease wearing the scapular in Church activities.

=== Politics ===
In Australia, the color teal, and the term "teal independents", became associated with a group of independent candidates in the 2022 Australian federal election who campaigned on a platform highlighting the importance of climate change action, tackling corruption in politics, and gender equality. These candidates are largely supported by Climate 200 and are often referred to by the media as 'teals' because that color is a blend of the blue of the Liberal Party and a green signifying green politics.

=== Art history ===
Green pigments for paints and fabric dyes were difficult to obtain from nature in the past, thus they were rarely employed in clothes or heraldic emblems. While green may have been blended with blue and yellow paints, mixing dissimilar substances was frowned upon due to suspicion of alchemy. Only during the early Renaissance did the superstitious custom fade away, and in the late eighteenth century, the German Swedish scientist Carl Wilhelm Scheele found new copper greens.

=== Issue awareness ===
Teal is the color of ovarian cancer awareness. Ovarian cancer survivors and supporters may wear teal ribbons, bracelets, T-shirts, and hats to bring public attention to the disease.

=== Academia ===
Teal is one of the school colors for Coastal Carolina University, along with bronze.

== Nature ==
Insects: Some dragonflies are cyan or teal.

== See also ==
- Lists of colors
