= Majorel =

International service company

Majorel Group Luxembourg S.A.
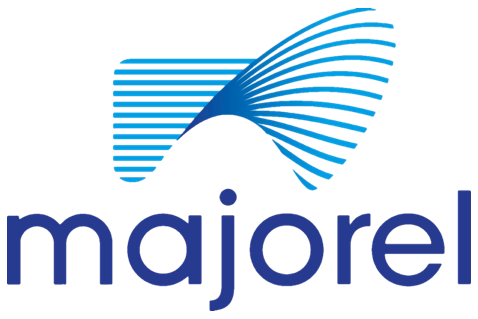
- Company type: public (S.A.)
- Traded as: Euronext Amsterdam: MAJ
- ISIN: LU2382956378
- Industry: business services
- Predecessors: Arvato CRM Solutions; Phone Group; Pioneers Outsourcing; ECCO Outsourcing
- Founded: 2019; 6 years ago
- Headquarters: Luxembourg
- Area served: worldwide
- Key people: Thomas Mackenbrock (CEO)
- Services: Customer experience (CX); Business process outsourcing (BPO)
- Revenue: ▲€2,100 million (2022)
- Number of employees: 82,000 (2022)
- Website: www.majorel.com

Majorel is an international service company, specialising in customer experience (CX) and business process outsourcing (BPO) services. It has more than 82,000 team members and operates in 45 countries on five continents. It was formed in 2019 through the merger of the customer relationship management businesses of Bertelsmann and the Saham Group.

== History ==
In September 2018, Bertelsmann and Saham announced plans to merge their global customer services businesses. The two companies had already worked together successfully in this area. Following approval by the relevant antitrust authorities, the transaction was completed at the beginning of 2019. The result was a company "with enormous clout", becoming the market leader in Europe, the Middle East and Africa, and a strong presence in America and Asia. The Majorel brand was introduced in February 2019. Since then, the company focused on global expansion.

Majorel has been acquired by Teleperformance SE. The combined business strengthens service delivery in the Americas and Europe while increasing presence in Asia-Pacific and Africa.

== Structure ==
The headquarters of Majorel are located in Luxembourg City. The company operates as a Société Anonyme (SA). On 24 September 2021, the company’s shares were listed on Euronext Amsterdam (Ticker Symbol: MAJ). Thomas Mackenbrock (Chief Executive Officer) leads the management team.

== Services ==
Majorel is a business-to-business provider whose services span the entire customer lifecycle, including front and back office processes.
