= The Morning Star Company =

Agribusiness and food processing company

- Type: Private
- Industry: Food products
- Founded: 1970; 56 years ago
- Founder: Chris J. Rufer
- Headquarters: Woodland, California
- Key people: Chris J. Rufer
- Website: morningstarco.com

The Morning Star Company is a Woodland, California-based agribusiness and food processing company founded in 1970. The company was originally founded as a trucking outfit by Chris Rufer, who remains the sole owner.

Morning Star processes about 40% of the California processing tomato production, and supplies a significant portion of the U.S. industrial tomato paste and diced tomato markets. It processes about 5 million tons of tomatoes each year. Its factories are capable of producing over 3,000 tons of tomatoes per hour. It has approximately 550 full-time employees and over 2,500 seasonal workers during harvest season. The company's revenue exceeds $1 billion per year. As of October 2023, it is the global market leader in tomato processing, supplying approximately "...10% of the world’s ingredient tomato products..."

Morning Star is a vertically integrated company with affiliates producing and transplanting tomato seedlings, harvesting tomatoes, and delivering them to processing factories.

The company has attracted attention for its philosophy of no supervisory management, a holacracy described by owner/founder Chris Rufer as "Mission Focused Self-Management." Workers are encouraged to innovate independently, define job responsibilities themselves, and even make equipment purchasing decisions in consultation with experts. Similarly, compensation is based on peer evaluations.

In 2013, Morning Star was listed as one of INC Magazine's Audacious Companies.

== History ==
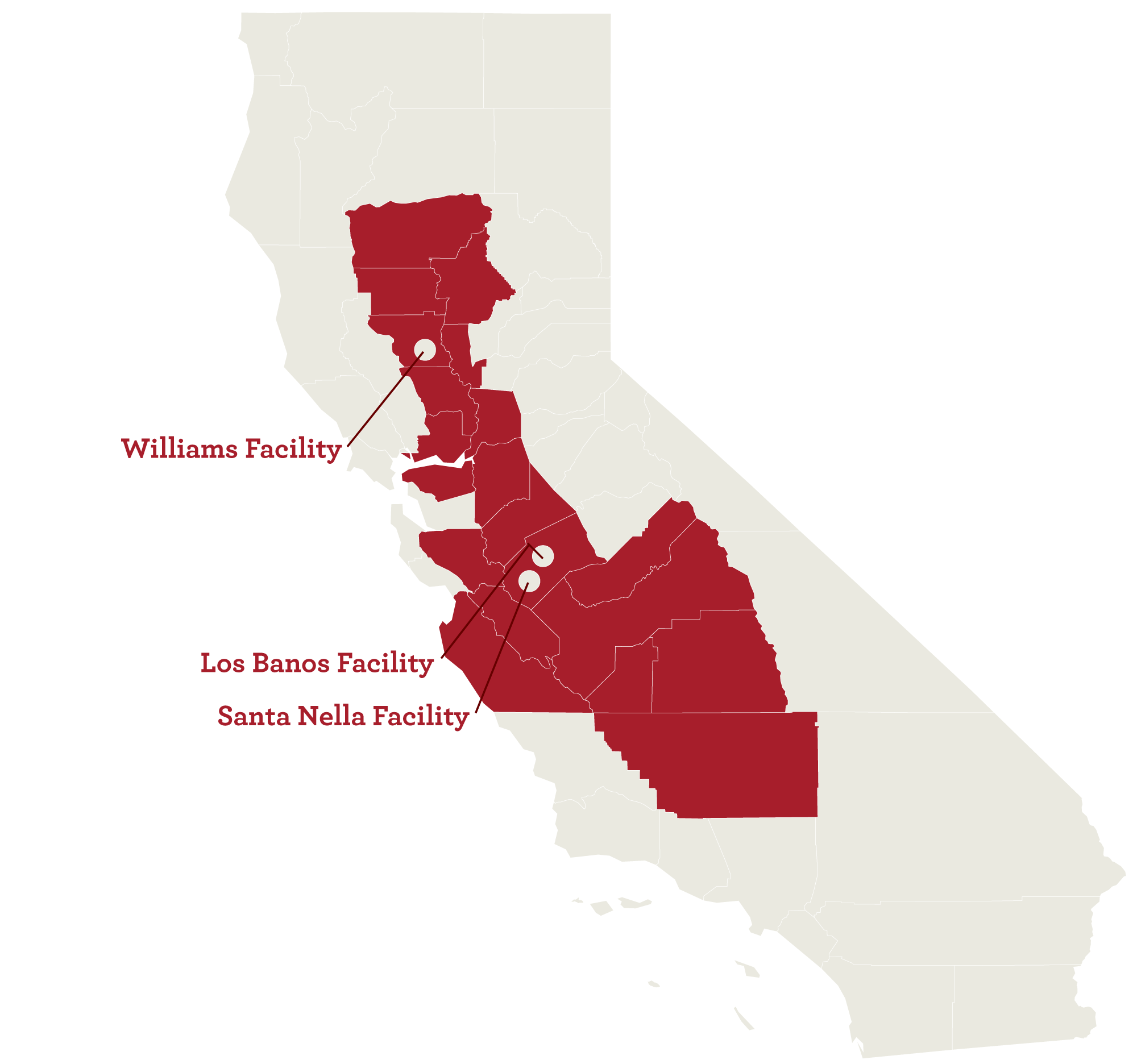

Chris Rufer founded Morning Star in 1970 as the owner-operator, transporting tomatoes from fields to canneries. Morning Star established its first factory in Los Banos, CA in 1990, and later expanded by constructing a second facility in Williams, CA (1995) and built a third factory in Santa Nella, CA (2002).

== Production mechanism ==
Morning Star, as part of its innovative approach to tomato paste production, has implemented several changes to improve its factories. These changes include the use of gravity-fed systems to remodel the unloading process, energy-saving measures like cooling ponds and elevated unloading systems, and the introduction of a 300-gallon bag-in-box packaging system. As a result, these measures have improved the company's ability to produce tomato paste that is both environmentally sustainable and efficient.

== Gallery ==
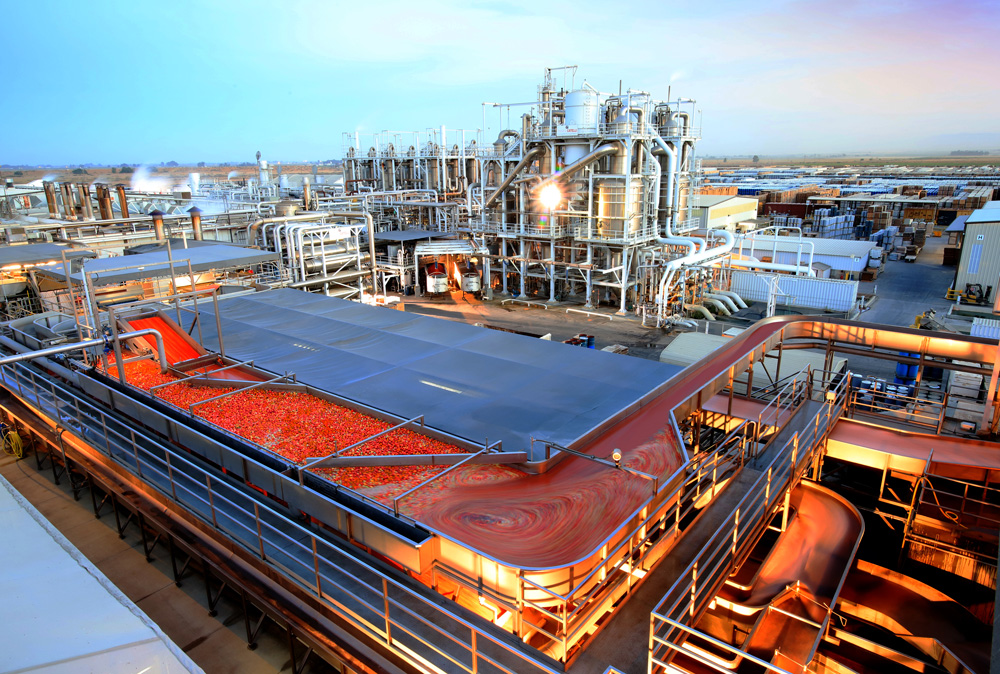
Tomato processing flume systems

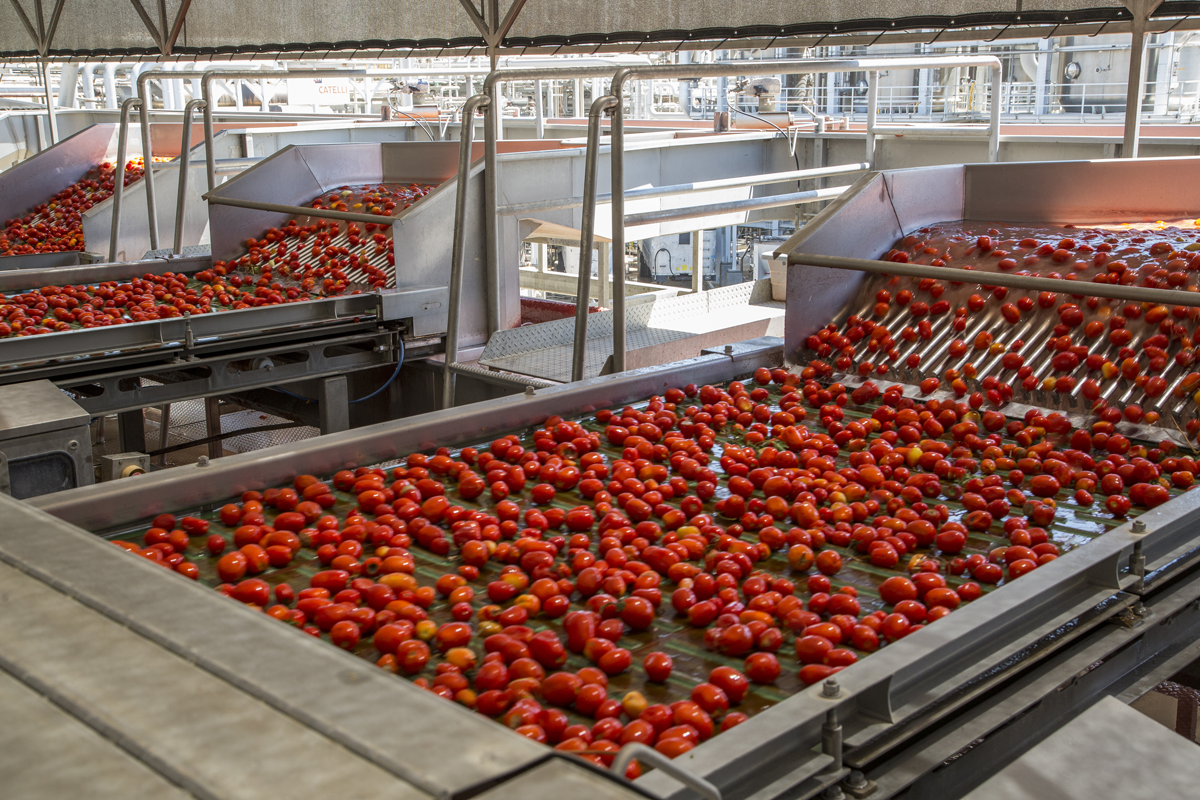
Tomato sort conveyor

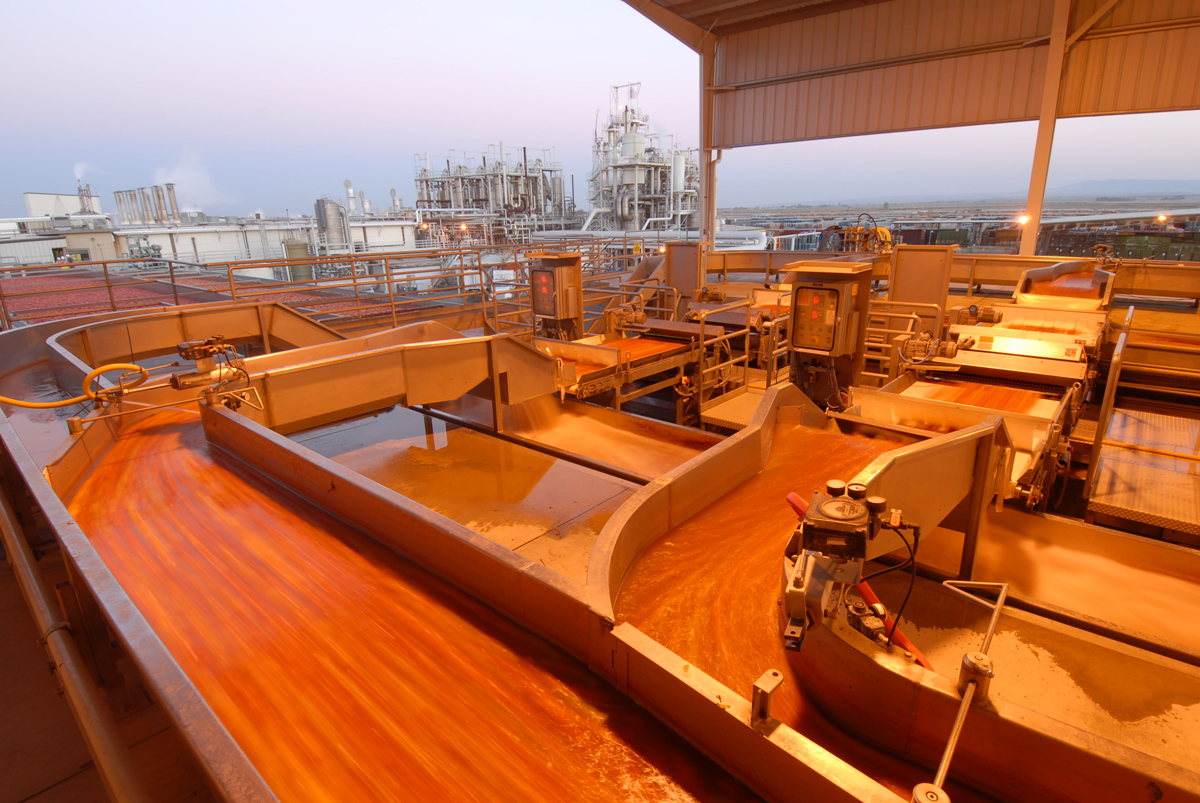
Tomato sort flumes

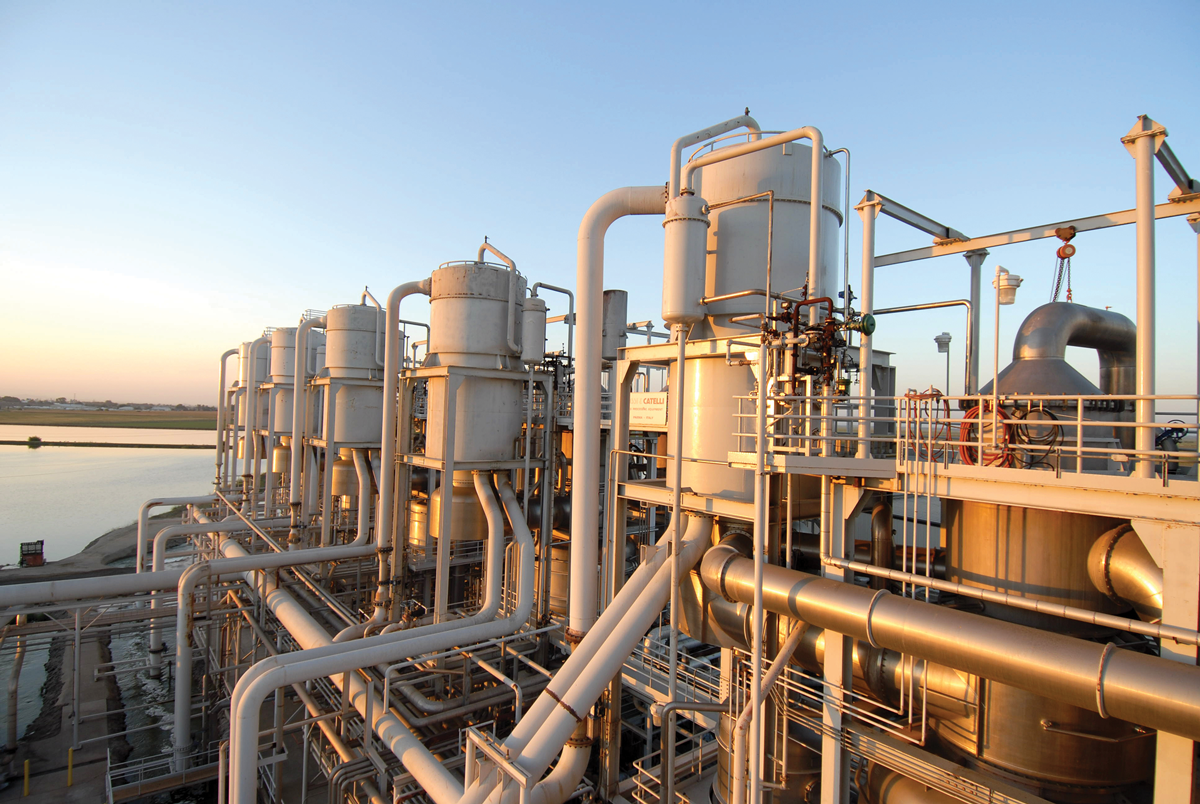
The Morning Star Company Evaporators

== See also ==
- Worker Cooperative
- Dominos Pizza - The Morning Star Company supplies a majority of the tomato pizza sauce for the USA market
- Heinz Tomato Ketchup - The Morning Star Company supplies a majority of the tomato paste ingredients for USA market
- Zappos
- Holacracy
