= Buurtzorg Nederland =

Dutch home-care organization

Buurtzorg Nederland is a Dutch home-care organization which has attracted international attention for its innovative use of independent nurse teams in delivering relatively low-cost care. The word buurtzorg is Dutch for “neighborhood care”.

== History ==
It was founded in 2006 in the small city of Almelo by Jos de Blok and a small team of professional nurses who were dissatisfied with the delivery of health care by traditional home care organizations in the Netherlands. According to Sharda S. Nandram, the company has created a new management approach: “integrating simplification,” characterized by a simple, flat organizational structure through which a wide range of services, facilitated by information technology, can be provided.

== Operation ==
When they go into a patient's home, Buurtzorg's nurses provide not only medical services but also support services, such as dressing and bathing, that are usually delegated to lesser-trained and cheaper personnel. Self-governing teams of 10 to 12 highly trained nurses take responsibility for the home care of 50 to 60 patients in a given neighbourhood. This permits flexibility in work arrangements to meet both nurses’ and patients’ needs. The organization has the most satisfied workforce of any Dutch company, with more than 1,000 employees. A study by KPMG published in January 2015 shows that the company is a low-cost provider of home-care services, and that this is not attributable to its patient mix. When the patients’ nursing home, physician, and hospital costs were added to the analysis, total per-patient costs were about average for the Netherlands.

The organisation describes a package of six sequential components, which cannot be delivered separately:

- assess the client's needs; the assessment is holistic and includes medical needs, Long Term Condition needs and personal/social needs. On the basis of the resulting information, the individual care plan will be drafted.
- map networks of informal care and involve them in care.
- to identify and include formal carers.
- care delivery.
- supporting the client in his/her social roles.
- promote self-care and independence.

== International ==
The company employed 10,000 nurses and 4,500 home help workers in 2018, with teams in the Netherlands, Sweden, and Japan. It now provides home care to about 80,000 people; more than half of all district nurses in the Netherlands work for the organization. In the USA the organization faces the need to deal with multiple payers, each with its own payment rules and procedures which makes it difficult for nurses to do their own billing as they do in Holland.

In 2018, NHS Wales launched a two-year Buurtzorg pilot funded by the Welsh Government, involving Aneurin Bevan University Health Board, Cwm Taf Morgannwg University Health Board, and Powys Teaching Health Board. Each pilot site was allocated £200,000 per financial year to develop "person-centred" community care teams. An evaluation by the University of South Wales found that the pilots successfully shifted care culture toward a more holistic approach and integrated new e-scheduling technology. While the pilots differed from the Dutch model by retaining team leaders, the role shifted significantly toward "compassionate leadership" and coaching to support staff autonomy. However, due to the lack of a consistent core dataset across the pilot sites, the evaluation was unable to draw definitive conclusions regarding the model's impact on clinical outcomes or cost savings.

In France, the not for profit organisation Soignons Humain (www.soignonshumain.com) has started operating in 2016, as official licensed partner of Buurtzorg.
