= Holacracy =

Management structure

Holacracy is a method of decentralized management and organizational governance, which claims to distribute authority and decision-making through a holarchy of self-organizing teams rather than being vested in a management hierarchy. Holacracy has been adopted by for-profit and non-profit organizations in several countries. This can be seen as a greater movement within organisational design to cope with increasingly complex social environments, that promises a greater degree of transparency, effectiveness and agility.

== Origins ==
The term is found in print for the first time in the adjectival form holocratic in a book from the Collège de 'Pataphysique published in May 1957.

Holacracy was developed at Ternary Software in Exton, Pennsylvania. Ternary founder Brian Robertson distilled the company's internal practices into an organizational system that became known as Holacracy in 2007. Robertson later developed the “Holacracy Constitution”, which sets out the core principles and practices of the system. In 2011, he released a document titled Manifesto 16 of Holacracy, which he later expanded, in June 2015, into the book Holacracy: The New Management System for a Rapidly Changing World, detailing and explaining these practices. He has stated that Holacracy bears similarities to the Scaled Agile Framework, sociocracy and Nexus. Robertson has also indicated that the term holacracy is derived from the term holarchy, coined by Arthur Koestler in his 1967 book The Ghost in the Machine.

Koestler wrote that a holarchy is composed of holons (Greek: ὅλον, holon, neuter form of ὅλος, holos, “whole”), or units that are autonomous and self-reliant but also dependent on the greater whole of which they are part. Thus, a holarchy is a hierarchy of self-regulating holons that function both as autonomous wholes and as dependent parts.

=== Influences and comparable systems ===
Holacracy, which is an alternative to command-and-control management, is one of several systems of flat organization. It has been compared to sociocracy, a system of governance developed in the second half of the 20th century.

In 2016, the consulting firm Findasense, founded by Rafael Tamames, announced that it had implemented Holacracy as its management system, describing itself as the first Spanish-speaking multinational to do so.

== Essential elements ==
- Roles instead of job descriptions: The building blocks of Holacracy's organizational structure are roles. Holacracy distinguishes between roles and the people who fill them, as one individual can hold multiple roles at any given time. A role is not a job description; its definition follows a clear format including a name, a purpose, optional "domains" to control, and accountabilities, which are ongoing activities to perform. Roles are defined by each circle—or team—via a collective governance process, and are updated regularly in order to adapt to the ever-evolving needs of the organization.
- Circle structure: Holacracy structures the various roles in an organization in a system of self-organizing (but not self-directed) circles. Circles are organized hierarchically, and each circle is assigned a clear purpose and accountabilities by its broader circle. However, each circle has the authority to self-organize internally to best achieve its goals. Circles conduct their own governance meetings, assign members to fill roles, and take responsibility for carrying out work within their domain of authority. Circles are connected by two roles known as "lead link" and "rep link", which sit in the meetings of both their circle and the broader circle to ensure alignment with the broader organization's mission and strategy.
- Governance process: Each circle uses a defined governance process to create and regularly update its own roles and policies. Holacracy specifies a structured process known as "integrative decision making" for proposing changes in governance and amending or objecting to proposals. This is not a consensus-based system, not even a consent-based system, but one that integrates relevant input from all parties and ensures that the proposed changes and objections to those changes are anchored in the roles' needs (and through them, the organization's needs), rather than people's preferences or ego.
- Operational process: Holacracy specifies processes for aligning teams according to operational needs, and requires that each member of a circle fulfill certain duties in order to work efficiently and effectively together. There are also key roles to help organise the process and workflow of each circle including Facilitator, Secretary, Lead Link, and Rep Link.

In contrast to the governance process, which is collective and integrative, each member filling a role has a lot of autonomy and authority to make decisions on how to best achieve his or her goals. Some have described the authority paradigm in Holacracy as completely opposite to the traditional management hierarchy; instead of needing permission to act or innovate, Holacracy gives blanket authority to take any action needed to perform the work of the roles, unless it is restricted via policies in governance or it involves spending some assets of the organization (money, intellectual property, etc.) Holacracy is highly biased toward action and innovation: it defaults to autonomy and freedom, then uses internal processes to limit that autonomy when its use in a specific way turns out to be detrimental.

Holacracy specifies a tactical meeting process that every circle goes through, usually on a weekly basis. A particular feature of this last phase, known as "triage", is to focus discussions on the concrete next steps needed by the individual who added the agenda item to address his or her issue. The intention is to avoid large, unproductive discussions dominated by the louder voices.

Its developer was described by The New York Times as "a computer programmer with no training in human resources, let alone occupational psychology" and The Wall Street Journal identified the requirement for "every decision must be unanimous" as detrimental. They also reported that "Fifteen percent of an organization’s time is spent in" ($27 billion of them "unproductive") meetings and made mention of Robertson's book.

== Contemporary practice ==
In the U.S., for-profit and not-for-profit organizations have adopted and practiced Holacracy. Examples include Zappos, the shoe retailing arm of Amazon, and Morning Star Company, a giant California-based tomato processing company. Medium used Holacracy for several years before abandoning it in 2016. A small number of research projects have reported the use of this style of management within the area of software development who promote its benefits for the search for greater innovation but raise concerns such as lack of usual structures and cultural habits around organising work, but more research is needed.

The New York Times wrote in 2015 that "The goal of Holacracy is to create a dynamic workplace where everyone has a voice and bureaucracy doesn’t stifle innovation." The Wall Street Journal had already asked in 2007 "Can a Company Be Run as a Democracy?" (and conceded that it "sounds like a recipe for anarchy"). The answer reportedly came when 18 percent of the employees at an online seller which had adopted this "radical self-management system" quit.

== Claimed advantages ==
Various claims have been made in respect of Holacracy. It is said to increase agility, efficiency, transparency, innovation and accountability within an organization, and to encourage individual team members to take initiative and gives them a process in which their concerns or ideas can be addressed. Further that the system of distributed authority reduces the burden on leaders to make every decision and can speed up communications and decision making processes (but this can introduce its own challenges). According to Zappos's CEO Tony Hsieh, Holacracy makes individuals more responsible for their own thoughts and actions.

== Criticisms ==
Steve Denning warned against viewing Holacracy as a panacea, claiming that instead of removing hierarchy, decisions are funneled down from circle to circle in a clear hierarchy, with each subsequent circle knowing less about the big picture than the one above. He also claimed that the rules and procedures are very detailed and focused on "administrivia." Lastly, Denning added that the voice of the customer was missing from the Holacracy model, concluding that for agile and customer-focused companies such as Zappos, Holacracy is a way to add administrative rigor, but that Holacracy would not necessarily work well in an organization that did not already have agility and passion for the customer. HolacracyOne partner Olivier Compagne replied to those criticisms on the company's blog, claiming that Denning's criticisms misunderstand Holacracy.

Problems occur when transitioning to this system, particularly if older systems of management are allowed to become a hidden structure and system of power, in addition to this, individuals' space can become lost within the constant connectedness.

In moving away from Holacracy, Andy Doyle of Medium noted that "for larger initiatives, which require coordination across functions, it can be time-consuming and divisive to gain alignment" and that Medium believed that "the act of codifying responsibilities in explicit detail hindered a proactive attitude and sense of communal ownership". They also noted that the inaccurate media coverage of Holacracy created a challenge for recruitment.

At Zappos, about 14% of the company left voluntarily in 2015 in a deliberate attempt by Zappos to only retain employees who believed in holacracy.

Other criticisms include a "one-size-fits-all" approach, layers of bureaucracy and more psychological weight.

== See also ==
- Collaborative e-democracy
- Corporatism
- Dee Hock (in particular re chaordic)
- Hierarchical organization
- Industrial democracy
- Open source governance
- Robert’s Rules of Order
- Sociocracy
- Waterfall model
- Workers' self-management
