= Alternative Theory of Organization and Management =

Alternative Theory of Organization and Management (ATOM) proposes a scientific approach to organization and management. Designed and developed by Seweryn Chajtman, the ATOM concept arose from a need to clarify the adoption and widespread recognition of laws and regularity that are based on strict criteria.

== Rationale ==
The reasons for the creation of ATOM include:

- The accumulation of knowledge dispersed in the specialist literature of many fields and disciplines;
- Excessive one-sidedness emerging from partial approaches;
- Lack of a synthetic, coherent approach that integrates various views on organization and management; and
- The need to establish the basic paradigms of organization and management regarding issues such as the dominant position of work processes, classification of management functions, partitioning systems into subsystems, process-modeling of systems, the relationship between the concepts of organization and management, and the objective classification of schools and directions.

== The subject of organization and management ==
The subjects of organization and management are exclusively:

Ergo-transformational process
A sequence of mutually dependent states of material transitions that occur due to purposeful actions (or designed and run by personnel) and influenced by functioning equipment. As a result, input material is transformed into a desired output or product.

Ergo-transformational system
A system of purposeful processing of material, objects and/or information, which is regulated (or controlled) by humans.

The essential nature of these processes and systems are the products that have been purposefully created, which are material objects or information.

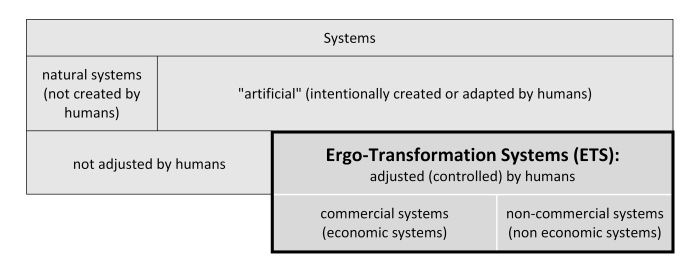
Table 1. Ergo-transformational systems located in the system classifications

In the classification of systems, the position of ergo-transformational systems is shown in Table 1. This classification is based on the degree of human intervention (involvement) in the system.

== Law and regularity ==
=== Law of ergo-transformational process: sequences of change ===
Any ergo-transformational process is the synthesis (or integration) of three parallel and mutually coupled components or sequences. The sub-processes involved are:

- The sequence of the state transitions of materiel [M];
- The sequence of human activities (or people) directly involved in the process [H]; and
- The sequence of state transitions of functioning equipment and tools [E].

This law is also called "the first basic law of organization and management". Consistently arise from its further logical regularity.

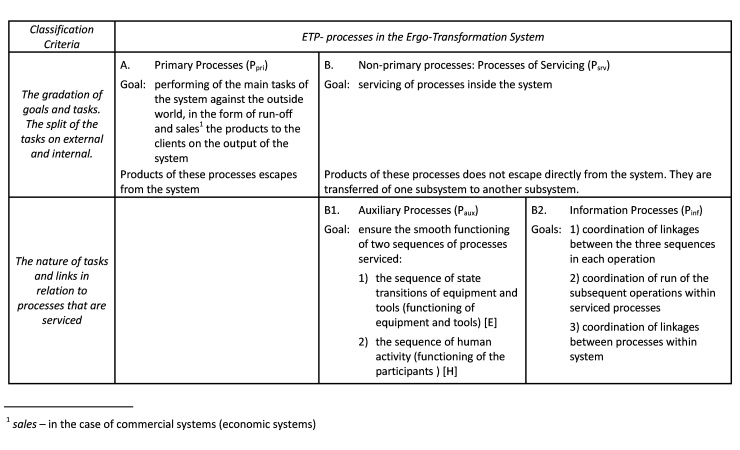
Table 2. Classification of ergo-transformational systems based on goals and relationships

Ergo-transformational systems are classified depending on the gradation of intended goals and on relationships resulting from service provision, as show in Table 2. They are distinguished by the following types of processes:

A) Primary Processes (P_{pri}),
B1) Auxiliary Processes (P_{aux}),
B2) Information Processes (P_{inf}).

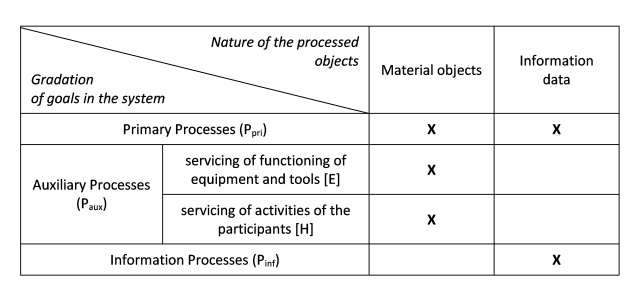
Table 3. Classification of ergo-transformational systems based on the nature of the material being processed

Classification could also be related to the nature of the distinct stages the processing of materials, as well as methods for information and data processing (see Table 3).

=== Law of servicing by auxiliary processes ===
The function of any ergo-transformational process requires servicing the sequence of human activities 'H' and the sequence of functioning of equipment and tools 'E', by the P_{aux} processes. One way to distinguish four categories of P_{aux} processes:

1. Processes for the repair and maintenance of equipment (P_{rep})
2. Processes for servicing tools (P_{t})
3. Processes of energy service (P_{en})
4. Processes for servicing people (P_{H})

As sub-categories of ergo-transformational processes, each P_{aux} process also requires servicing by other auxiliary processes.

=== Law of servicing by information processes ===
The function of any ergo-transformational process is dependent on the integration of its three sequences through servicing by P_{inf} processes. Segmentation of ergo-transformational the process for consecutive operations also requires servicing by the binding P_{inf} processes. Therefore, any ergo-transformational process requires servicing by three kinds of P_{inf}:

1. P_{inf} processes binding three sequences of ergo-transformational process within individual operations
2. P_{inf} processes binding subsequent operations within an ergo-transformational process
3. P_{inf} processes binding processes of the ergo-transformational system

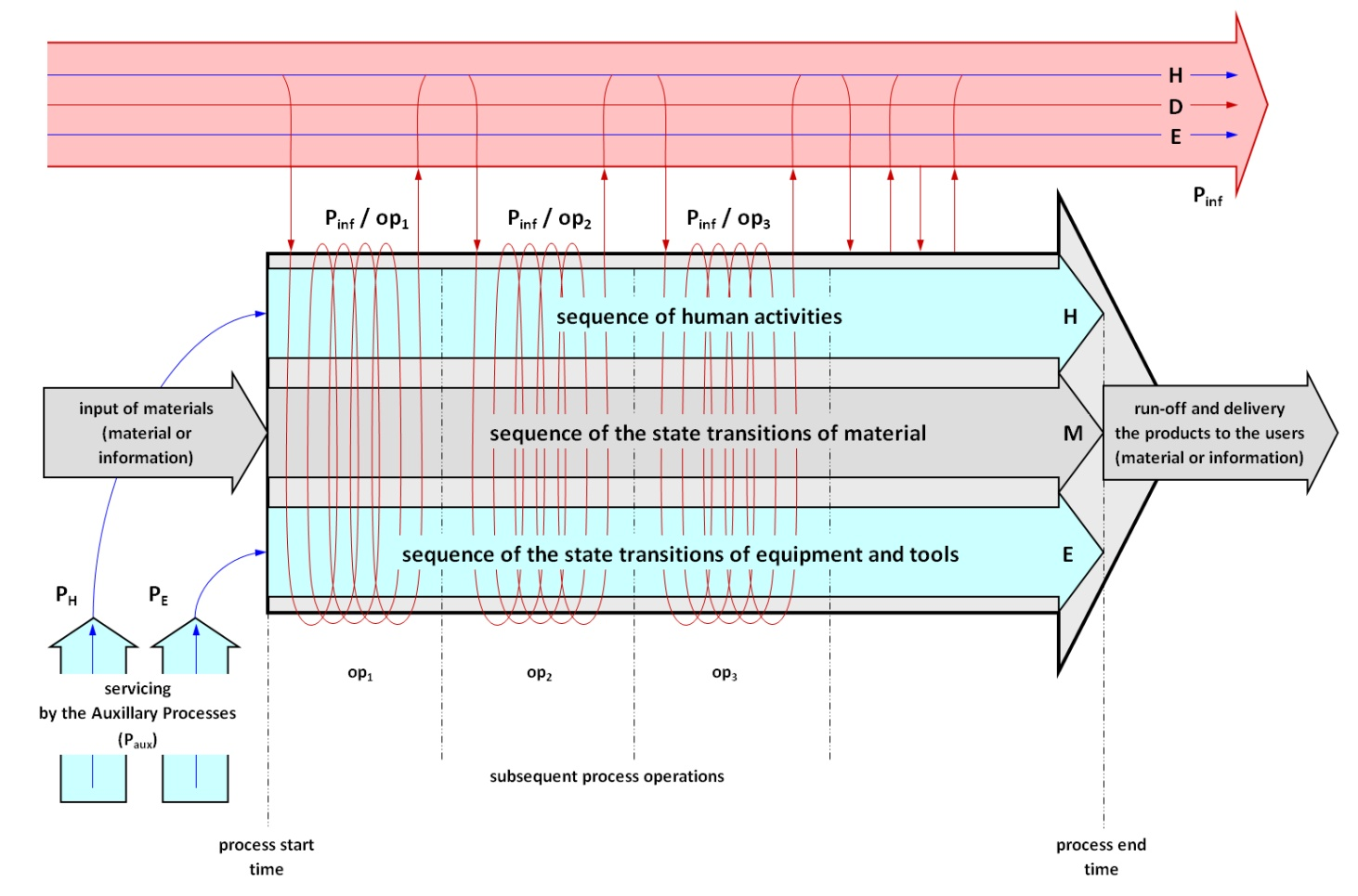
Figure 1. A logical model of the ergo-transformational process

Any P_{inf} process, as a special category of an ergo-transformational process, also requires servicing by another P_{inf} process (and of course, by other P_{aux} processes), unless done by itself. Figure 1 presents a logical model of the ergo-transformational process.

=== Law of multi-dimensional decomposition and synthesis of ergo-transformational systems ===
The law of multi-dimensional decomposition and synthesis of ergo-transformational systems can be considered "the second basic law of organization and management". The primary issue of identification or designing each ergo-transformational system (new or improved) is their accurate decomposition into subsystems. Arbitrary decomposition into subsystems is methodologically unacceptable, as it is not based on precise criteria.

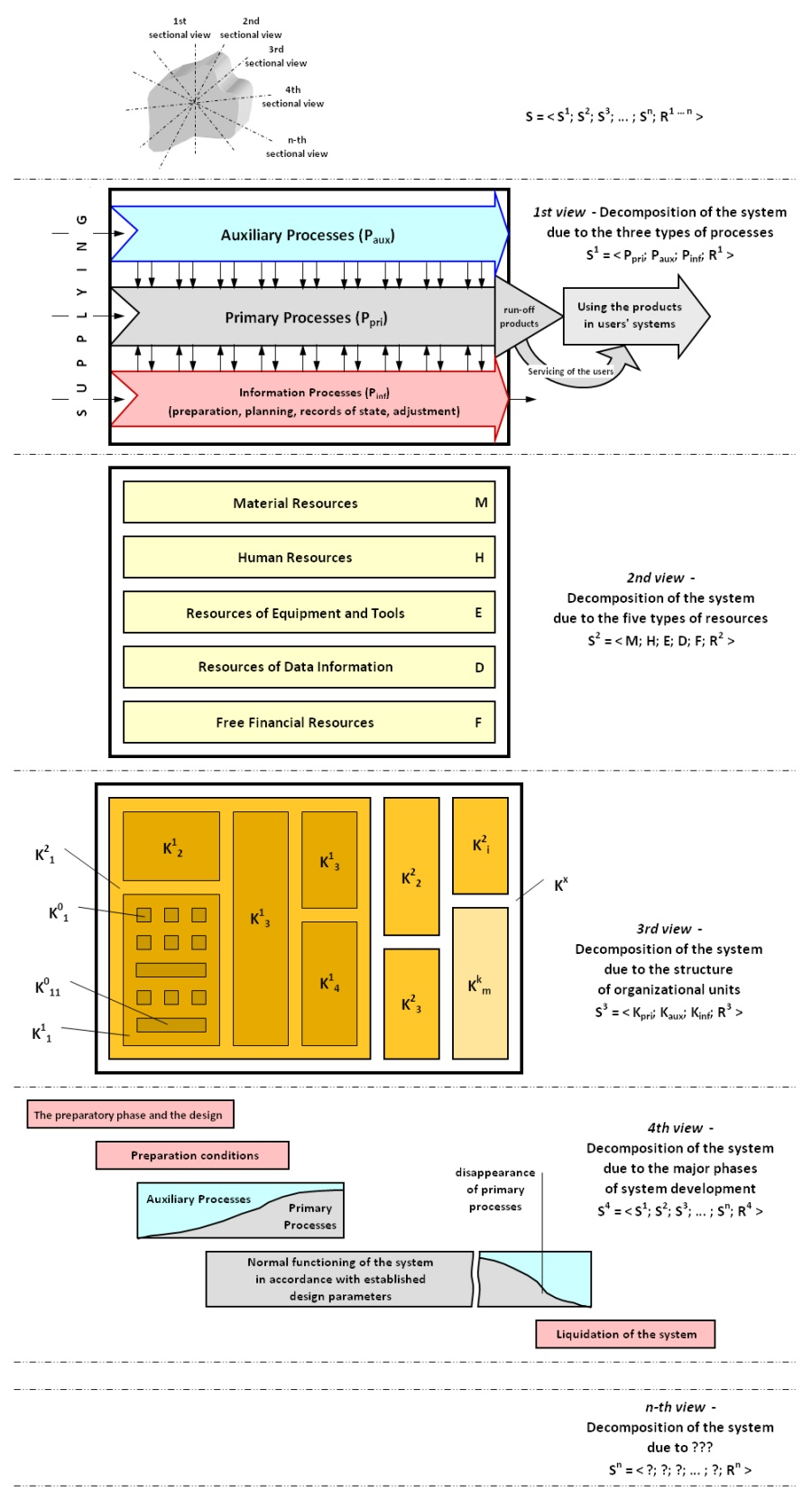
Figure 2. Schema of the ergo-transformational system model

ATOM does not treat the system as a "flat" configuration, but as a "spatial" one, taken from several points of view – as separate, although reciprocally incorporated "sectional views" (reflections) – depending on separable criteria of decomposition. It is assumed that these cuts may be many, but so far only four criteria (sectional views and structures) have been successfully established:

1. The first sectional view considers the system as the structure of all processes occurring within the system: S^{1} = ⟨P_{pri}; P_{aux}; P_{inf}; R^{1}⟩.
2. The second refers to the structure of all the resources participating in the system. These are materials and products [M], people [H], equipment and tools [E], information resources [D], capital and financial resources [F]: S^{2} = ⟨M; H; E; D; F; R^{2}⟩.
3. The third reflects the hierarchical structure of all organizational units (primary, auxiliary and informational) that make up the ergo-transformational system: S^{3} = ⟨K_{pri}; K_{aux}; K_{inf}; R^{3}⟩.
4. The fourth presents the dynamics of subsequent stages of the development of the system, from the design of the facility and preparing the way through the stage of implementation and normal operation up to the change or possible liquidation of the system: S^{4} = ⟨S^{1}; S^{2}; S^{3}; R^{4}⟩.

The individual sectional views belong to the relational configuration of the system: Sn = ⟨S^{1}; S^{2}; S^{3}; S^{4}; ... ; R^{1...n}⟩. Figure 2 shows the schema of this system model.

=== Law of the phasic structure of integral information processes ===
The law of the phasic structure of an entire Information Process can be described as "the third basic law of organization and management". It is a prelude to determining further regularity for the design of information subsystems.

The essence of any information process (P_{inf}) is to service other processes or objects. In any integral P_{inf} process there are four consecutive phases:

1. The phase of preparation of prospective product parameters of serviced processes, the methodology and other factors (normative N_{1})
2. The phase of planning serviced processes (N_{p})
3. The phase of recording current state, and the results of running serviced processes, once operational (Rec)
4. The phase of the control and adjustment of serviced processes

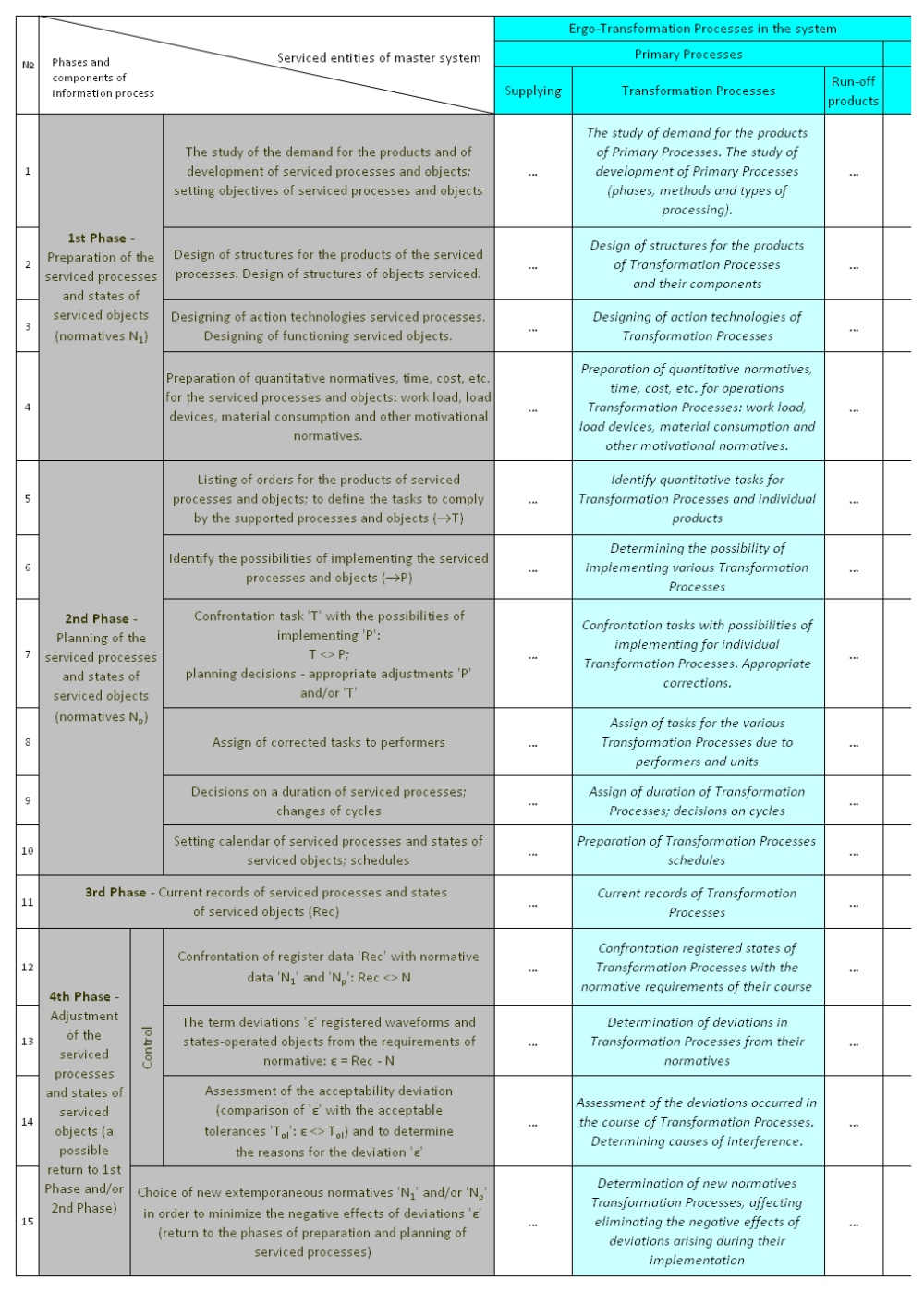
Table 4. The next phases of any ergo-transformational process

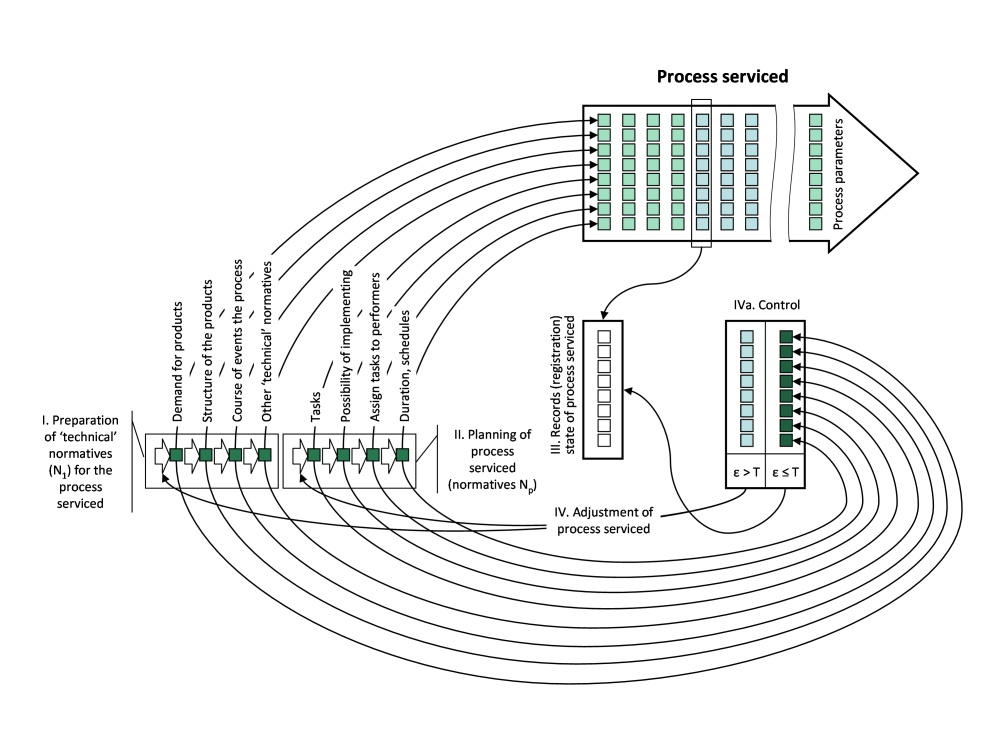
Figure 3. Relationships between the phases of the information process and parameters of other serviced processes

A more detailed interpretation of the successive phases of any P_{inf} process is presented in Table 4. Figure 3 shows the relationships between the phases of the information process and the parameters of serviced processes.

=== Regularity of the links between processes: models of relationships ===
This regularity and its models are a consequence of the previously specified laws i.e. the law of the process structure (the three related sequences of changes), the law of obligatory servicing of two sequences by specialized auxiliary processes (P_{aux}) and the law of the servicing of sequences by relevant information processes (P_{inf}). There could be many possible combinations of servicing and coupling of processes. In all cases, this always places without exception the law of servicing every component within ergo-transformational processes. Figure 4 demonstrates the linkages and couplings between serviced and servicing processes of an ergo-transformational system.

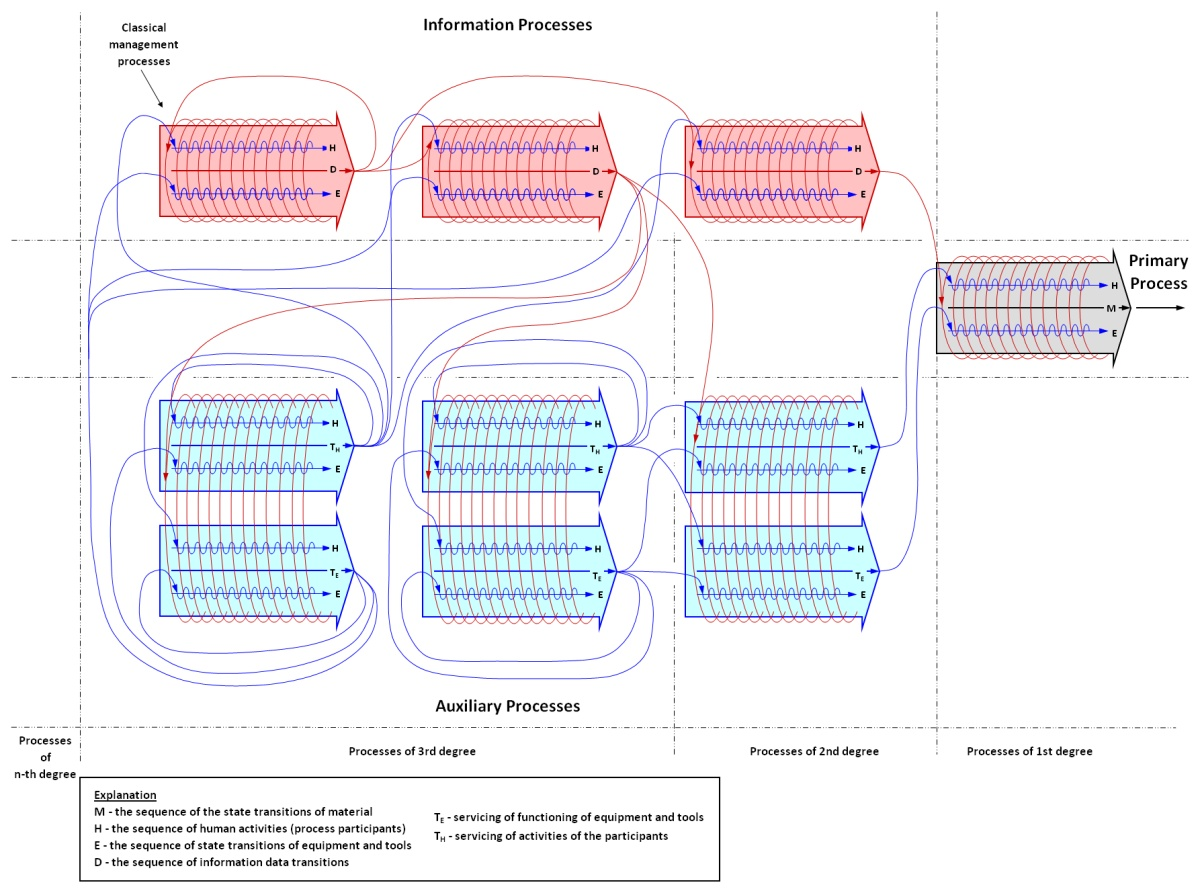
Figure 4. An example model of linkages and couplings between the serviced and servicing processes of the ergo-transformational system

=== Regularity of combinatorics ===
In any ergo-transformational system, the occurrence of a set of primary (P_{pri}), auxiliary (P_{aux}) and information processes (P_{inf}) is mandatory. Depending on the nature of the materials, their processing is grouped with a method for information processing. Figure 5 refers to the mutual relationships between P_{pri}, P_{aux} and P_{inf} in the ergo-transformational system.

Figure 5. Mutual relationships between Primary Processes (P_{pri}), Auxiliary Processes (P_{aux}) and Information Processes (P_{inf}) in ergo-transformational system

== Management as a special kind of information process ==
The regularity of the above shows that management can only be logically interpreted as a higher degree P_{inf} process. This process coordinates several P_{inf} processes to a lower degree. Particularly relevant to management processes is its integrity; they must take into account the requirements for the comprehensive control of all P_{pri}, P_{aux} and P_{inf} as well as cover all four phases and components of the information process.

According to a gradation of linkages and coupling of ergo-transformational processes, the process of management is a P_{inf} process of at least 3rd degree (P_{inf} ≥ 3), co-ordinating those of at least 2nd degree (P_{inf} ≥ 2). Lower degrees (P_{inf} ≤ 2) can be oriented to either phase or part of an integrated information process, or to the control of one kind of process in an ergo-transformational system.

It follows that the term "organization" – in the sense of function – can be interpreted by each information process at various levels in an ergo-transformational system. For example, personnel at the workplace – master, technologist, engineer, clerk, planner, controller, etc. – are certainly involved in the organization but do not always have to be in "management", which usually is the domain of information processes of higher degrees.

== Bibliography ==
1. Chajtman, S.; Zyzik, M. (1984). "Some Theoretical Problems of the Factory of the Future". Proceedings of the Conference on Factory of the Future. Tel Aviv.
2. ——; Zyzik, M. (1985). "The Identification of Information Processes in the Manufacturing". Proceedings of the 8th International Conference on Production Research. Stuttgart.
3. —— (1986). Systemy i procesy informacyjne [Information systems and processes] (in Polish). Warsaw: Panstwowe Wydawnictwo Ekonomiczne PWE. ISBN 83-208-0521-X. OCLC 750061229.
4. ——; Borzęcki, J. (1987). Методические проблемы моделирования системы управления как основа их автоматизации и применения ЭВМ [Methodological problems of modeling management system as the basis for its automation and the use of computers]. COMPCONTROL Conference (in Russian). Moscow.
5. ——; Zyzik, M. (1987). "Modelling Relations Between Processes in the Production System". Proceedings of the 9th International Conference on Production Research. Cincinnati, Ohio, USA.
6. ——; Borzęcki, J. (1988). "Metodyczne podstawy analizy i projektowania struktury aparatu zarządzania przedsiębiorstwa na tle wieloprzekrojowej dekompozycji systemu gospodarczo-produkcyjnego" [Methodological basis for the analysis and design of business management structure on a background multiple cross-sectional decomposition of the economic system]. Zeszyty Naukowe Politechniki Poznańskiej (in Polish). 14. Poznan.
7. ——; Borzęcki, J. (1989). Выделение информационной системы в хозяйственной единице как основа комплексного проектирования информатических систем [Extracting information system of an enterprise as a basis for the design of complex IT systems]. COMPCONTROL Conference (in Russian). Bratislava.
8. —— (2002). "Alternatywne poglądy nieodzownym warunkiem przekształcenia wiedzy o organizacji i zarządzaniu w uogólnioną teorię i akceptowaną naukę" [Alternative views indispensable condition for the transformation of knowledge about the organization and management theory in the generalized and accepted science]. In Krupski, R.; Lichtarski, J. (eds.). Stan i perspektywy rozwoju teorii i praktyki zarządzania na progu XXI wieku [Status and prospects of development of the theory and practice of management on the threshold of the twenty-first century] (in Polish). Wroclaw: Wydawnictwa Akademii Ekonomicznej we Wrocławiu.
