= Arabinda Ghosh =

Indian philosopher, yogi, maharishi, poet, and Indian nationalist (1872–1950)

Maharishi Sri Aurobindo
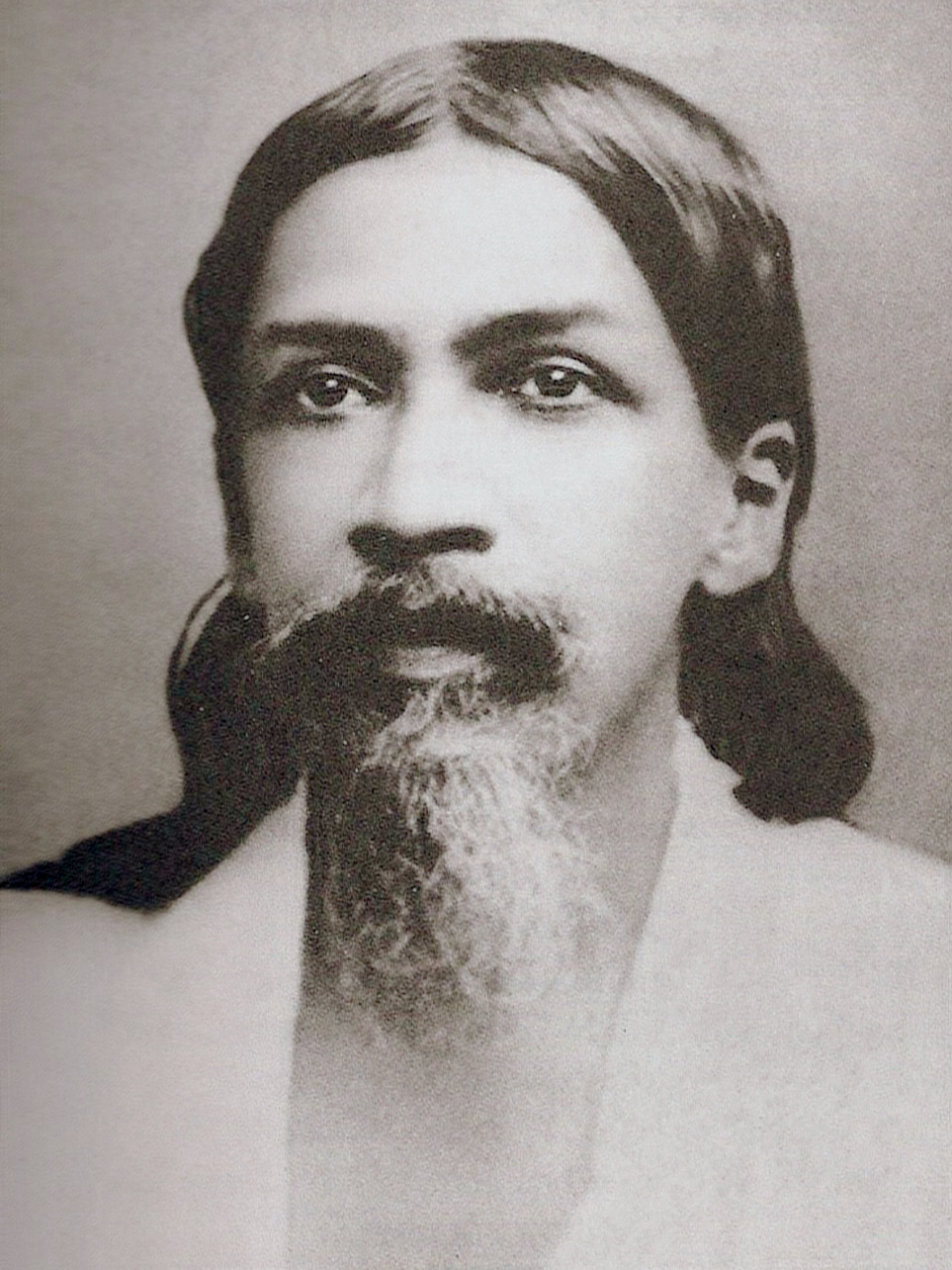
- Sri Aurobindo in 1919
- Born: Aurobindo Ghose; 15 August 1872; Calcutta, Bengal Presidency, British India
- Died: 5 December 1950 (aged 78); Pondicherry, French India

Education
- Education: King's College, Cambridge (BA)

Philosophical work
- Main interests: Indian philosophy, Integral yoga, Poetry, Indian independence movement
- Notable works: The Life Divine, Savitri: A Legend and a Symbol, The Synthesis of Yoga
- Notable ideas: Integral yoga, Supermind, Involution, Spiritual evolution

Sri Aurobindo (born Aurobindo Ghose; 15 August 1872 – 5 December 1950) was an Indian philosopher, yogi, maharishi, poet, and Indian nationalist. He was also a journalist, editing newspapers such as Bande Mataram. He joined the Indian movement for independence from British colonial rule, emerging as one of its most influential and fiery leaders. Later in his life, he underwent a profound spiritual transformation, developing a new spiritual path which he termed Integral yoga, aiming for a divine life on Earth.

While his early years were marked by a strictly Anglicised upbringing and education in England, his return to India sparked a deep rediscovery of his cultural roots. From a revolutionary leading the charge against the Partition of Bengal, Aurobindo transitioned into a mystic sage in Pondicherry. Together with his spiritual collaborator, Mirra Alfassa (known as "The Mother"), he founded the Sri Aurobindo Ashram. His extensive literary output, most notably the philosophical magnum opus The Life Divine and the epic poem Savitri: A Legend and a Symbol, continues to influence modern spiritual thought worldwide.

== Early life and education ==
Aurobindo Ghose was born in Calcutta (now Kolkata) on 15 August 1872 in a Bengali Hindu family. His father, Krishna Dhan Ghose, was an Assistant Surgeon in the former Bengal region, and his mother was Swarnalata Devi. His father had deep admiration for British culture and lifestyle, determined that his children should receive a wholly Western education, entirely free from Indian influences.

In 1877, Aurobindo and his two elder brothers, Benoybhusan and Manmohan, were sent to the Loreto House boarding school in Darjeeling. In 1879, the boys were taken to England. Aurobindo was placed in the care of a Latin scholar, Reverend W. H. Drewett, in Manchester. Drewett grounded the young Aurobindo in Latin, Greek, and European history, deliberately keeping him away from Indian culture as per his father's strict instructions.

In 1884, Aurobindo joined St Paul's School in London, where he immersed himself in the classics, winning several prizes for literature and history. In 1890, he secured a senior classical scholarship to King's College, Cambridge. During his time at Cambridge, he passed the open competition for the prestigious Indian Civil Service (ICS). However, he had no genuine desire to serve the British Empire as an administrator. He deliberately arrived late for the compulsory horse-riding test, ensuring his disqualification from the service. At this time, the Maharaja of Baroda, Sayajirao Gaekwad III, was travelling in England. Aurobindo secured an appointment in the Baroda State Service and left for India in 1893.

== Return to India: The Baroda Period (1893–1906) ==
Aurobindo's return to India in 1893 marked a turning point in his life. The Anglicised youth, who could barely speak his native Bengali, began a passionate and rigorous self-education in Indian culture, languages, and scriptures. During his 13 years in Baroda, he worked in various administrative departments before becoming a professor of English and French at Baroda College (now Maharaja Sayajirao University of Baroda).

It was here that he taught himself Sanskrit, Bengali, Marathi, and Gujarati. He read deeply into the Upanishads, the Bhagavad Gita, and the epics Ramayana and Mahabharata. This period also saw his early foray into secret political activities. While maintaining his respectable public position, Aurobindo began working behind the scenes to establish secret revolutionary societies in Bengal and Maharashtra, notably connecting with the Anushilan Samiti.

== Political awakening and nationalist leadership (1906–1910) ==
The turning point for Aurobindo’s public political career was Lord Curzon's deeply unpopular Partition of Bengal in 1905. He left his lucrative job in Baroda and moved to Calcutta in 1906 to openly join the nationalist movement. He became the first Principal of the newly established Bengal National College (which later became Jadavpur University).

He also took over the editorial duties of the English daily newspaper Bande Mataram. His fiery and articulate editorials became the intellectual backbone of the radical nationalist movement, transforming the political discourse from mere petitioning to a demand for Purna Swaraj (complete independence). He worked closely with other extremist leaders of the Indian National Congress, such as Bal Gangadhar Tilak, Bipin Chandra Pal, and Lala Lajpat Rai—famously known as the Lal-Bal-Pal triumvirate. At the historic 1907 Surat session of the Congress, Aurobindo played a pivotal role in the split between the Moderates and the Extremists.

=== Alipore Bomb Case and Spiritual Awakening ===
In May 1908, Aurobindo was arrested by the British police in connection with the Alipore bomb case, following an assassination attempt on a British magistrate by revolutionaries Khudiram Bose and Prafulla Chaki. Aurobindo was imprisoned in solitary confinement at Alipore Jail for a year as an under-trial prisoner.

This period of incarceration changed the trajectory of his life completely. He spent his time in jail practicing intense yoga and reading the Bhagavad Gita. He later reported experiencing profound spiritual visions, including the realisation of the omnipresent divine (the Vasudeva experience) in everything and everyone around him—including the prison walls, the guards, and his fellow inmates.

Defended brilliantly by the nationalist lawyer Chittaranjan Das, Aurobindo was acquitted of all charges in May 1909 due to a lack of evidence. Upon his release, he was no longer just a political firebrand; he had become a mystic with a deeper, spiritual vision for India and humanity.

== Pondicherry and the Sri Aurobindo Ashram (1910–1950) ==
Following his release, Aurobindo briefly continued his journalistic work, starting two new publications: Karmayogin in English and Dharma in Bengali. However, facing imminent arrest again by the British authorities, he followed an "inner command" and quietly sailed to Chandannagar and then to Pondicherry (a French enclave) in 1910, effectively placing himself out of British jurisdiction.

In Pondicherry, he retired from active politics to dedicate himself entirely to his spiritual practice. In 1914, after four years of silent yoga, he began publishing a philosophical monthly magazine called Arya, in which most of his major works were serialised over the next seven years.

In 1914, he met Mirra Alfassa, a French spiritual seeker who recognised him as the mentor she had seen in her inner visions. Following the end of World War I, she returned to Pondicherry permanently in 1920. Aurobindo referred to her as "The Mother," recognising her as his spiritual equal and collaborator.

On 24 November 1926, Aurobindo experienced a major spiritual realisation (often referred to as the descent of the Overmind). Following this event, he retired into complete seclusion for the rest of his life, leaving the practical management of the newly formed Sri Aurobindo Ashram to The Mother. The ashram grew rapidly, attracting seekers from across India and the globe.

== Philosophy and Integral Yoga ==
Sri Aurobindo's philosophical vision is fundamentally grounded in the concept of spiritual evolution. Unlike traditional Indian paths of ascetic renunciation (which seek liberation away from the world), Aurobindo proposed Integral Yoga. This path seeks not just a release from the cycle of birth and death, but a transformation of earthly life itself.

His core tenet is that the universe is a manifestation of the Divine. According to Aurobindo, human beings are not the final step in the evolutionary scale. Just as life emerged from matter, and mind emerged from life, a higher consciousness—which he termed the Supermind—is destined to emerge from the current mental consciousness. The aim of Integral Yoga is to accelerate this evolutionary process, bringing down the supramental light to transform human nature into divine nature.

== Literary works ==
Sri Aurobindo was a prolific writer, poet, and philosopher. His major works include:

- The Life Divine (1939): His primary philosophical treatise, detailing his theory of spiritual evolution and the destiny of humanity.
- The Synthesis of Yoga (1948): A practical guide comparing traditional yogic systems and outlining the path of Integral Yoga.
- Savitri: A Legend and a Symbol (1950): A nearly 24,000-line epic poem in blank verse based on a tale from the Mahabharata, widely considered his magnum opus and one of the longest epic poems in the English language.
- The Secret of the Veda (1956): Explores the esoteric and psychological meaning behind the ancient Vedic hymns.
- Essays on the Gita (1922): A psychological and philosophical commentary on the Bhagavad Gita.
- The Human Cycle (1949): An exploration of human social evolution.

== Death and legacy ==
Sri Aurobindo passed away on 5 December 1950 in Pondicherry at the age of 78. Over 60,000 people attended to see his body, which remained in repose for four days before being interred in the courtyard of the Ashram, a place now known as the Samadhi.

His legacy spans both the political and spiritual realms. As a nationalist, he is remembered as a pioneering architect of the Swadeshi movement and one of the first leaders to articulate a vision of complete independence. As a philosopher and yogi, his teachings on the evolution of consciousness bridge Eastern mysticism and Western evolutionary thought, offering a radically optimistic vision for the future of humanity. His vision continues to be championed by the Sri Aurobindo Ashram, the experimental international township of Auroville (founded by The Mother in 1968), and countless followers worldwide.

== See also ==
- Auroville
- Indian independence movement
- Integral psychology
- Neo-Vedanta
