= Chaitanya (consciousness) =

Hindu philosophical concept

Chaitanya (Sanskrit: चैतन्य) refers variously to 'awareness', 'consciousness', 'Conscious Self', 'intelligence' or 'Pure Consciousness'. It can also mean energy or enthusiasm. The meaning of name Chaitanya also stands for "State of Conscious Energy".

== Etymology ==
It is derived from cetanā (Sanskrit: चेतना), which refers to living things or consciousness itself.

== Scripture ==
In the Rig Veda (R.V.IV.XL.5), Nrishad is the dweller amongst humans; Nrishad is explained as Chaitanya or 'Consciousness' or Prana or 'vitality' because both dwell in humans.

In his commentary on the Isha Upanishad, Sri Aurobindo explains that the Atman, the Self manifests through a seven-fold movement of Prakrti. These seven folds of consciousness, along with their dominant principles are:

1. annamaya puruṣa - physical
2. prāṇamaya puruṣa - nervous / vital
3. manomaya puruṣa - mental / mind
4. vijñānamaya puruṣa - knowledge and truth
5. ānandamaya puruṣa - Aurobindo's concept of Delight, otherwise known as Bliss
6. caitanya puruṣa - infinite divine self-awareness
7. sat puruṣa - state of pure divine existence

The first five of these are arranged according to the specification of the panchakosha from the second chapter of the Taittiriya Upanishad. The final three elements make up sat-cit-ananda, with cit being referred to as chaitanya.

The essential nature of Brahman as revealed in deep sleep and Yoga is Chaitanya (pure consciousness).

== Vedanta ==
The Vedantists also speak about the Consciousness or Mayaopahita-chaitanya that is associated with the indescribable Maya which is responsible for the functions of creation, preservation and dissolution of entire Existence, and about the Consciousness or Avidyaopahita-chaitanya that is associated with Avidya which causes the wrong identification of the Atman with the body etc.; after negating both Maya and Avidya, that is, after all distinctions are obliterated, what remains is Pure Consciousness or Chaitanya.

The form of an object that the mind assumes, after coming into contact with that object or enveloping it, is called Vritti. The process of enveloping is called Vritti-Vyapti. Vyapti is pervasion and the pervasion by the mind of a certain location called the object is Vritti-Vyapti. The awareness that the object is there illuminates the object due to the presence in this moving process called the mind and is called phala-vyapti. It is only because of the consciousness attending on the mind that the object is perceived. Vedanta says that the object cannot be wholly material and there is no qualitative difference between the object and consciousness which consciousness by coming into contact with the object knows that the object is there which fact implies that consciousness is inherent in the object. This is the Vishaya- chaitanya or the 'object-consciousness' which does not mean consciousness of the object but the object which is a phase of consciousness which prevails everywhere.

To advaitins, it refers to a pure consciousness that knows itself and also knows others.

== See also ==
- Cetanā, Buddhist concept
- Cit (consciousness)
