= Integral yoga =

Yoga system of Sri Aurobindo

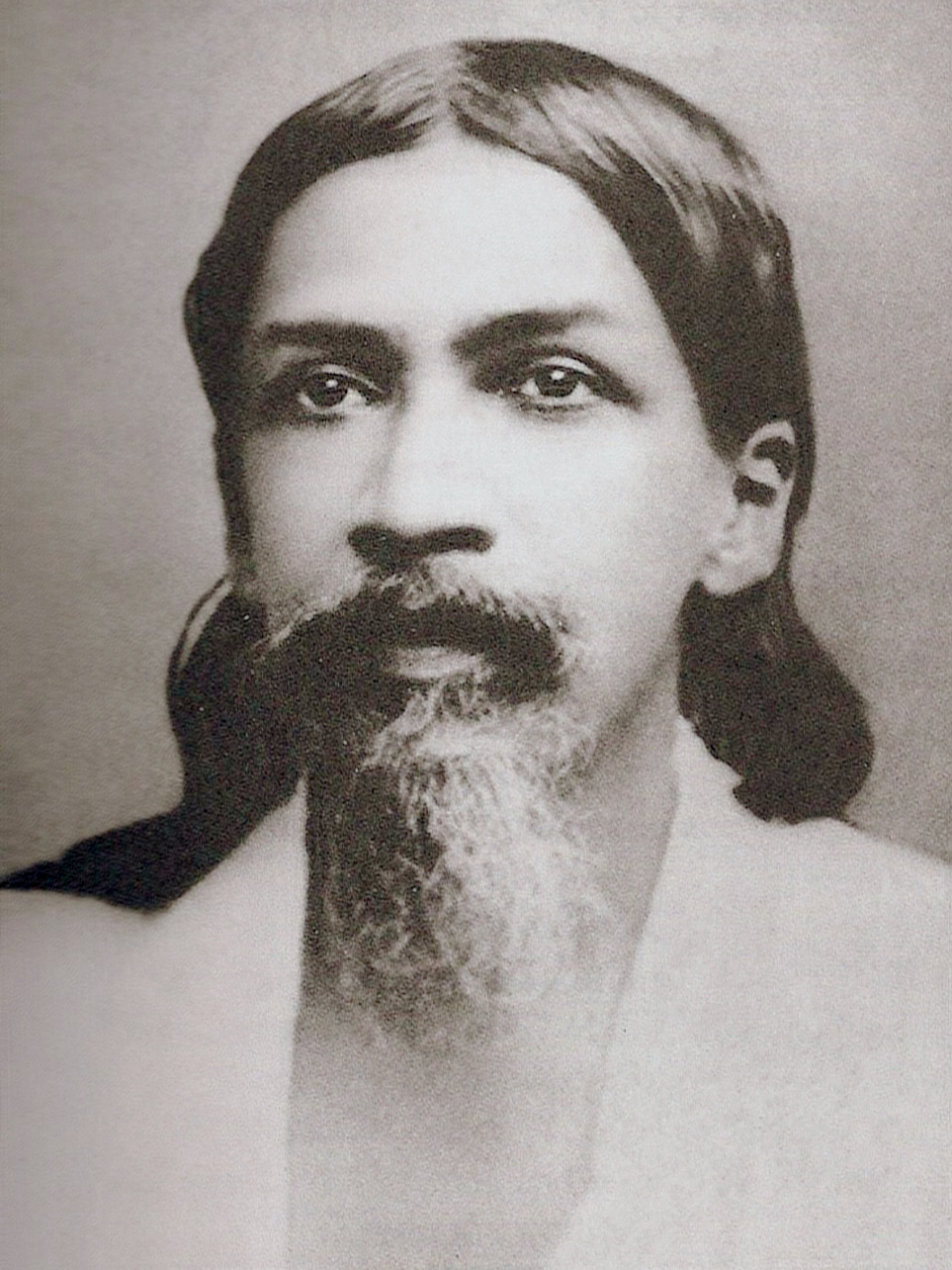
- Sri Aurobindo
- Founder: Sri Aurobindo, The Mother
- Established: 1926

Integral Yoga (or Purna Yoga) is the spiritual philosophy and practice developed by Sri Aurobindo and The Mother (Mirra Alfassa). Central to this philosophy is the concept of involution, a process in which the Spirit plunges into the "Inconscience" of Matter, followed by evolution, where the Spirit progressively manifests itself back through the material world.

According to Sri Aurobindo, the current status of humanity is not final; rather, man is a "transitional being" in an intermediate stage of evolution, destined to unfold the Spirit and manifest the Supramental consciousness to transform earthly life. While unassisted natural evolution is a slow process taking centuries or many births, Integral Yoga is defined as a "rapid and concentrated conscious evolution" capable of accelerating this change in a single lifetime. To achieve this, the practice utilizes a "triple labour of aspiration, rejection and surrender," leading to a "triple transformation": the psychic change (changing the nature into a soul-instrumentation), the spiritual change (descending of higher Light and Power), and the supramental transmutation (ascent into the Supermind and the transforming descent of the supramental Consciousness).

== Worldview ==
=== Spirit - Satchitananda ===
Spirit or satchitananda is the Absolute, the source of all that exists. (Note: Sri Aurobindo Studies, Sat-Chit-Ananda is the Source of the Manifested Universe) It is the One, having three aspects: Sat (truth), Citta (consciousness, awareness), and ananda (bliss, happiness).

=== Involution ===
Involution is the extension of Spirit, the Absolute, to create a universe of separate forms. Being manifests itself as a multiplicity of forms, meanwhile becoming lost in the inconscience of matter. The first manifestation of Spirit in the process of involution is as Satchitananda, and then as Supermind, the intermediate link between the higher (Spirit) and lower (matter, life, and mind) nature.

According to Aurobindo the world is a differentiated unity. It is a manifold oneness, that generates an infinite variety of lifeforms and substances. The lifeforms and substances are stretched out on a wide range, from physical matter to a pure form of spiritual being, akin to the five koshas or sheaths, where the subject becomes fully aware of itself as spirit:

- Material: a submerged consciousness concealed in its action and losing itself in the form.
- Vital: an emerging consciousness, a consciousness half delivered out of its original imprisonment which has become of vital craving and satisfaction or repulsion.
- Mental: an emerged consciousness reflecting fact of life in a mental sense, perceptive and ideative. It modifies the internal and attempts to modify conformably the external existence of the being.

Above Mind proper lie various higher levels of Mind, which ascend toward Spirit.

=== Evolution ===
Through evolution Spirit rediscovered itself as Spirit. Evolution follows a developmental trajectory from the original inconscience of matter into life, to mind, and then to spiritualized mind, culminating in The Supermind or Truth Consciousness. Evolution is teleological, since the developing entity contains within itself already the totality toward which it develops. It is not a mechanistic or deterministic teleology, but a "manifestation of all the possibilities inherent in the total movement."

=== The goal of integral yoga ===
The goal of Integral yoga is to become aware of the Divine, to integrate the physical, mental and spiritual aspects of ourselves, and to manifest the Divine at earth. According to Sri Aurobindo, all life is Yoga, while Yoga as a sadhana is a methodised effort towards self-perfection, which brings to expression the latent, hidden potentialities of being. Success in this effort unifies the human individual with the universal and transcendental Existence. Integral yoga reunites "the infinite in the finite, the timeless in the temporal and the transcendent with the immanent.

== Three types of being ==
Sri Aurobindo discerns three types of being: the Outer being, the Inner being, and the Psychic Being.

=== The Outer Being ===
The Outer Being includes the physical, vital and mental levels of Being, which characterises our everyday consciousness and experience. This includes several levels of the subconscient: a mental subconscient, a vital subconscient, and a physical subconscient, down to the material Inconscient. (Note: Satprem, Aurobindo, or the adventure of consciousness.) Integral Yoga involves going beyond this surface consciousness to the larger life of the Inner Being, which is more open to spiritual realisation.

=== The Inner or Subliminal Being ===
The Inner Being, or Subliminal, includes the inner realms or aspects of the physical, vital and mental being. They have a larger, subtler, freer consciousness than that of the everyday consciousness. Its realisation is essential for any higher spiritual realisation.

The Inner Being is also transitional between the surface or Outer Being and the Psychic or Inmost Being. By doing yoga practice (sadhana), the inner consciousness is being opened, and life turns away from the outward to the inward. The inner consciousness becomes more real than the outer consciousness, and becomes a peace, happiness and closeness to the Divine.

=== The Psychic Being ===
The Psychic Being is Sri Aurobindo's term for the Personal Evolving Soul (the Higher Mind, Illumined Mind, Intuition and Overmind), the principle of Divine spirit in every individual. (Note: According to The Mother, the term "Psychic" or Psychic Being is derived from the occult kabbalistic teachings of Max Théon. Sri Aurobindo distinguishes between the Psychic Being as being defined in his Integral Yoga, and the ordinary meaning of "psychic," which refers more to psychological phenomena, or to paranormal phenomena, which are connected with the subtle physical layers.) The Psychic is the "Innermost Being", (Note: Amal Kiran) the permanent being in us that stands behind and supports the physical, vital and mental principles. It "uses mind, life and body as its instruments," undergoing their fate yet also transcending them.

In Integral Yoga the goal is to move inward and discover the Psychic Being, which then can bring about a transformation of the outer nature. This transformation of the outer being or ego by the Psychic is called Psychicisation; it is one of the three necessary stages in the realisation of the Supramental consciousness. This Psychic transformation is the decisive movement that enables a never-ending progress in life, through the power of connecting to one's inner spirit or Divine Essence. The Psychic begins its evolution completely veiled and hidden, but grows through successive lifetimes, and gradually exerts a greater influence, taking on the role of spiritual Guide.

==== Central Being ====
Central Being refers to the transcendent and eternal spirit, as opposed to the incarnate and evolving Soul, which he calls the Psychic Being. Sometimes it refers to both of them together as the essential spiritual core of the being. The Central Being "presides over the different births one after the other but is itself unborn" (ibid p. 269). This transcendent Central Being or Spirit is also designated as the Jiva or Jivatman, although the meaning of these terms in Sri Aurobindo's philosophy differs greatly from that of much of conventional Vedanta (especially Advaita Vedanta)

== Levels of being ==
Aurobindo's model of Being and Evolution
Levels of Being					Development
Overall	Outer Being		Inner Being	Psychic Being	Development
Supermind	Supermind				Gnostic Man
Supermind	Supermind				Supra-mentalisation
Mind		Overmind			Psychisation and Spiritualisation
Mind		Intuition			Psychisation and Spiritualisation
Mind		Illuminated Mind			Psychisation and Spiritualisation
Mind		Higher Mind			Psychisation and Spiritualisation
Mind	Subconscient mind	Mind proper	Subliminal (inner) mind		Evolution
Vital	Subconsc. Vital	Vital	Subl. (inner); Vital		Evolution
Physical	Subconsc. Physical	Physical	Subl. (inner); Physical		Evolution
Inconscient	Inconscient				

The levels of being ascend from the inconscient to the Supermind.

=== Inconscient ===
Inconscient Matter is the lowest level of involution. Spirit is still present in the inconscient: "The Inconscient is the Superconscient's sleep." The Inconscient is also the instrument of the Superconsciousness which has created the Universe. According to Satprem, the Inconscient lies at the bottom of the physical subconscient, and "life emerged ... at the border between the material inconscient and the physical consciousness ... in our body.

=== Subconscient and subtle or subliminal conscient ===
The physical, vital and mental levels of being contain both a subconscient and a subtle or subliminal part.

==== The subconscient ====
The subconscient parts are the submerged parts. It contains "obstinate samskaras, impressions, associations, fixed notions, habitual reactions formed by the past." According to Satprem, there are several levels of the subconscient, corresponding with the different levels of our being: a mental subconscient, a vital subconscient, and a physical subconscient, down to the material Inconscient.

According to Aurobindo, the body is partly a creation of the inconscient or subconscient. According to The Mother, the ordinary, false consciousness, which is common to material body-consciousness, is derived from the subconscient and the inconscient. According to Aurobindo, the outer being depends on the subconscient, which hinders the spiritual progress. Only by living in the inner being can this obstacle be overcome.

According to Sharma, the subconscient is "the inconscient in the process of becoming conscient." It is a submerged part of the personality without waking consciousness, but which does receive impressions, and influences the conscious mind. According to Sharma, it includes the unconscious mind which is described by psychologists like Sigmund Freud and Carl Jung, though it includes much more than the unconscious of (Freudian) psychology. (Note: According to Pani, the inconscient is the same as the western psycho-analytic unconscious mind, while the subconsciousness is another layer of consciousness.)

==== The subtle or subliminal conscient ====
The subtle or subliminal is the subtle, higher counterpart of the subconscient. According to Sharma, "it has an inner mind, an inner vital being, and an inner subtle physical being, wider than man's consciousness." It can directly experience the Universal, and "it is the source of inspirations, intuitions, ideas, will ... as well as ... telepathy [and] clearvoyance."

=== Gross body ===
The gross body commonly referred to in yoga constitutes mainly of two parts the material physical body (annakosha) and the nervous system normally refer to as vital vehicle (Prana kosha) in Integral yoga.

==== Physical ====
The Physical level refers to both the physical body and the body's consciousness. The body is just as conscious as the vital and mental parts of the being, only it is a different type of consciousness. The Physical not only shades upwards to higher ontological levels, but also downwards into the Subconscient. (Note: The Physical can be subdivided into finer sub-grades: the Physical Proper or pure body consciousness, which represents the consciousness of the external physical body itself.; the Vital Physical or Nervous Being (which seems to be equivalent to the Etheric body of western esotericism, and hence pertains to one of the subtle bodies); the Mental Physical (similar to the Physical Mind - see "Mental"); the True physical being - is the Purusha of the physical level, which is like the Inner Physical larger than the surface body consciousness and in touch with the a larger spiritual consciousness.; the Inner physical - the physical component of the inner being, which is wider and more plastic than the outer physical body. This is also called the subtle physical)

The Subtle physical is Sri Aurobindo's term for a subtler aspect of the physical nature. This has many qualities not found in the gross physical nature. In The Agenda, The Mother often refers to it. It might be compared to the etheric body and plane, or even the astral body and plane. The term "subtle physical" is used to distinguish it from gross (sthula) or outer material physical. (Note: Aurobindo: "By the gross physical is meant the earthly and bodily physical - as experienced by the outward sense-mind and senses. But that is not the whole of Matter. There is a subtle physical also with a subtler consciousness in it which can, for instance, go to a distance from the body and yet feel and be aware of things in a not merely mental or vital way....the subtle physical has a freedom, plasticity, intensity, power, colour, wide and manifold play (there are thousands of things there that are not here) of which, as yet, we have no possibility on earth.")

==== Vital ====
The Vital level of the being refers to the life force, but also to the various passions, desires, feelings, emotions, affects, compulsions, and likes and dislikes. These strongly determine human motivation and action through desire and enthusiasm.

Unlike Western psychology, in which mind, emotions, instincts, and consciousness are all lumped together, Sri Aurobindo strongly distinguishes between the "Vital" and the "Mental" faculties.

In addition to the individual Vital faculty, Sri Aurobindo refers to a Vital Plane or Vital world, which would seem to be partly equivalent to the astral plane of popular occultism and New Age thought.

=== Mind or Mental being ===
Mind proper is the conceptual and cognitive mind, the manakosha. Mind is a subordinate process of the Supermind. It is the intermediary stage between the Divine and the mundane life. It works by measuring and dividing reality, and has lost sight of the Divine. It is the seat of ignorance, yet it is still capable of an upward ascent toward the Divine.

Unlike Western psychology, in which mind and consciousness are considered the same, Sri Aurobindo strongly distinguishes between the "Mental" and the "Vital" (emotional) faculties, as well as between Mind and pure Consciousness. Sri Aurobindo in part bases his concept of the Mental on his reading of the Taittiriya Upanishad, the mental being (or perhaps just the Mental Purusha) is the mano-maya-atma – the self made of mind (manas).

For Sri Aurobindo, Mind or the Mental being is not simple and uniform, but consists itself of various strata and subdivisions, which act at different levels of being. These various faculties are described or variously referred to, usually in obliquely or in passing, in some of his books, including Savitri, which has poetic references to many types of Mind. In his letters answering questions from disciples, Sri Aurobindo summarises the characteristics of the various levels of Mind. (Note: A small but popular book by Jyoti and Prem Sobel, The Hierarchy of Minds, comes closest to a systematic coverage of an Aurobindonian noetology by gathering all of Sri Aurobindo's references and quotes on the subject of "Mind" and arranging these according to the type of Mind. These various Minds and Mental principles of being include: Physical Mind: The Mechanical Mind is a much lower action of the mental physical which when left to itself can only repeat the same ideas and record the reflexes of the physical consciousness in its contact with outward life and things.; Mind in the physical or mental physical mentalises the experiences of outward life and things, sometimes very cleverly, but it does not go beyond that, unlike the externalising mind which deals with these things from the perspective of reason and its own higher intelligence.; Physical Mind - refers to either or both the Externalising Mind and the Mental in the Physical; it is limited to a physical or materialistic perspective, and cannot go beyond that, unless enlightened from above.; Mind of Light - according to The Mother this is the Physical Mind receiving the supramental light and thus being able to act directly in the Physical.; Vital Mind: Vital Mind - a mediator between the vital emotions, desires, and so on the mental proper. It is limited by the vital view and feeling of things, and expresses the desires, feelings, ambitions, and other active tendencies of the vital in mental forms, such as daydreams and imaginations of greatness, happiness, and so on. As with the Externalising Mind, Sri Aurobindo associates it with the Vishuddha or Throat Chakra; Mind proper: Mind Proper - is free-fold, consisting of Thinking Mind, dynamic Mind, externalising Mind. It constitutes the sum of one's thoughts, opinions, ideas, and values, which guide conscious thinking, conceptualizing and decision-making processes, and is transformed, widened, and spiritualised through the practice of Integral Yoga.; Thinking Mind - the highest aspect of the mind proper, concerned with ideas and knowledge in their own right. It is equated with the Ajna Chakra; Dynamic Mind - that aspect of the ordinary mind that puts out of mental forces for realisation, acting by the idea and by reason. It is also equated with the Ajna or Brow center.; Externalising Mind - the most "external" part of the mind proper, concerned with the expression of ideas in speech, in life, or in any form it can give. It is equated with the Vishuddha or Throat Chakra; Higher Mind: Higher Mind - the first and lowest of the spiritual mental grades, lying above the normal mental level.; Spiritual Mind - either the spiritualised mind, or a general term for levels of mind above the normal mental level (the "Mind Proper").; Inner mind - the mental component of the Inner Being, which lies behind the surface mind or ordinary consciousness and can only be directly experienced by sadhana; True mental being - is the Purusha of the mental level freed from the error and ignorance of the lower Prakriti and open to the knowledge and guidance above.; Psychic Mind - a movement of the mind in which the Psychic Being predominates; the mind turned towards the Divine)

=== Spiritual Being ===
Above mind proper lie various higher individual levels of mind, namely the Higher Mind, Illumined Mind, Intuitive Mind and Overmind, which ascend toward the Spirit, and provide a higher and more inclusive vision of reality:

- Higher Mind is the realm of Truth-thought. It can hold a wide range of knowledge in one vision and an integral whole. (Note: Compare Ken Wilber's Centaur or vision-logic; see Integral theory (Ken Wilber)#Levels or stages) It receives illumination from the Illumined Mind, and is not dependent on the limited knowledge of the senses. It is also capable of transforming the lower realms of body and mind, effectuating changes of habit and life. Nevertheless, it is still a state of thought, in contrast to Illumined Mind, which is a state of vision and spiritual insight.
- Illumined Mind is the mind of sight and vision. It transforms the Higher Mind by providing it a direct vision.
- Intuition provides the illumination of thought and vision to the Higher Mind and the Illumined Mind. Mundane mind may experience intuition too, but in the higher realms of mind it becomes more frequent and stable.
- Overmind is the Cosmic Consciousness. It is the plane of Gods. Overmental plane is the highest consciousness one can achieve without transcending the mental system. Beyond overmind are the planes of Supermind or unity-consciousness. (Note: A detailed description of the Overmind is provided in Book I ch.28, and Book II ch.26, of Sri Aurobindo's philosophical opus The Life Divine.)

=== Supermind ===
Supermind is the infinite unitary Truth Consciousness or Truth-Idea beyond the three lower planes of Matter, Life, and Mind. Supermind is the dynamic form of Sachchidananda (Being-Consciousness-Bliss), and the necessary mediator or link between the transcendent Sacchidananda and the creation.

== Limitations of the present being ==
Humans are stuck between matter and Spirit, due to the habits of personality and partial awareness, which arise from Ignorance.

=== Personality ===
Humans are accustomed to respond to certain vibrations more than others. These customs develop into one's desire, pain, feelings, which are all a set of habits. This crystallised set of habits becomes one's personality. This is normally believed to be "self". The appearance of stable personality is given by constant repetition and recurrence of the same vibrations and formations.

=== Three basic difficulties for mankind ===
According to Aurobindo, humans face three basic problems:

1. Partial Self-awareness: humans are only aware of a small part about themselves. They are aware of the surface of mentality, physical being, and life, and not of the larger and more potent subconscious mind and hidden life impulses.
2. Partial awareness of other beings: humans create a rough mental construction of their fellow beings. Their understanding is created by a mental knowledge, which is imperfect, and subjected to denial and frustration. This partial awareness can be overcome by a conscious unity. This unity can only be achieved from Supermind.
3. A division between Force and consciousness in evolution: matter, life and mind are often warring with each other. Materialists try to resolve this war by submitting oneself to the mortality of our being, while ascetics have tried to reject earthly life. A true solution may lie in finding the principle beyond mind, thereby overcoming the mortality of our existence.

=== Ignorance ===
The fundamental cause of falsehood, error and evil is Ignorance. Ignorance is a self-limiting knowledge, which arises with exclusive concentration in a single field. According to Aurobindo, human notion of good, bad & evil are uncertain and relative.

== Practices ==
Unlike other Yoga practices Integral yoga does not propose any kind of physical asanas, breathing techniques or external movements. It is more psychological in nature, with internal reflection and self analysis & correction as main tools of development.

The main practices or approaches are divided into

- The yoga of divine work (yoga through one's work)
- The yoga of Integral Knowledge (Yoga through analysis, observation and knowledge)
- The Yoga of Divine love (Commonly referred to as Bhakti yoga or love of god)
- The Yoga of Self-Perfection (referred to as a Synthetic yoga or the triple way)

=== The Yoga of Self-Perfection ===
==== The Triple Transformation ====
The limitations of the present being can be overcome by the Triple transformation, the process in which the lower nature is transformed into the divine nature. It consists of the inward psychicisation by which the sadhak gets in contact with the inner divine principle or Psychic Being; the spiritual transformation or spiritualisation; and the Supramentalisation of the entire being. (Note: This is described in The Life Divine part 2, ch.25, and Letters on Yoga part 4, section 1.)

===== Psychicisation =====
Psychicisation is a turn inward, so that one realises the psychic being, the psychic personality or Divine Soul, in the core of one's being. The Divine Soul serves as a spiritual Guide in the yoga, and enables one to transform the outer being. It may also help avoid the dangers of the spiritual path. There is an intermediate zone, a dangerous and misleading transitional spiritual and pseudospiritual region between the ordinary consciousness and true spiritual realisation.

Psychisiation consists of three methods. In "consecration" one opens oneself to the Force before engaging in an activity. "Moving to the Depths" (or "concentration") is a movement away from the surface existence to a deeper existence within. "Surrender" means offering all one's work, one's life to the Divine Force and Intent. Guided by the evolving divine soul within, the sadhak moves away from ego, ignorance, finiteness, and the limitations of the outer being. It is thanks to this guidance by the Divine Soul that the sadhak can avoid the pitfalls of the spiritual path.

===== Spiritualisation =====
As a result of the Psychicisation, light, peace, and power descend into the body, transforming all of its parts, physical, vital, and mental. This is the Spiritual transformation, or Spiritualisation, the concretisation of the larger spiritual consciousness.

===== Intermediate zone =====
Aurobindo asserted that spiritual aspirants may pass through an intermediate zone where experiences of force, inspiration, illumination, light, joy, expansion, power, and freedom from normal limits are possible. These can become associated with personal aspirations, ambitions, notions of spiritual fulfilment and yogic siddhi, and even be falsely interpreted as full spiritual realisation. One can pass through this zone, and the associated spiritual dangers, without harm by perceiving its real nature, and seeing through the misleading experiences. Those who go astray in it may end in a spiritual disaster, or may remain stuck there and adopt some half-truth as the whole truth, or become an instrument of lesser powers of these transitional planes. According to Aurobindo, this happens to many sadhaks and yogis.

===== Supramentalisation =====
Supramentalisation is the realisation of the Supermind, or Supramental consciousness, and the resulting transformation of the entire being. Psychicisation and spiritualisation serve as necessary prerequisites for the Supramentalisation of the entire being.

The supramental transformation is the final stage in the integral yoga, enabling the birth of a new individual, fully formed by the supramental power. Such individuals would be the forerunners of a new supra-humanity, grounded in truth-consciousness. All aspects of division and ignorance of consciousness, at the vital and mental levels, would be overcome, and replaced with a unity of consciousness at every plane. And even the physical body transformed and divinised. A new supramental species would then emerge, living a supramental, gnostic, divine life on earth.

Aurobindo describes several results and different stages depicting the stages of development in integral yoga, called together the sapta chatushtaya, "seven quadrates." (Note: Integral Yoga of Sri Aurobindo and the Mother, Sapta Chatushtaya) (Note: Dr. Debashish Banerji, Seven Quartets of Becoming: A Transformative Yoga Psychology Based on the Diaries of Sri Aurobindo) (Note: Aurobindo received these instructions as a series of mantras while he was imprisoned in Alipore prison. They were copied by Arun to use for study. (Note: Integral Yoga of Sri Aurobindo and the Mother, The origin of the Sapta Chatusthaya)) It consists of:

- Shanti (peace, calm), which consists of samatha (calming of the mind), shanti (peace), sukha (happiness), and hasya (Atmaprasada, contentment of the Atman);
- Shakti (power), which consists of shakti (the power of the primordial energy), virya (energy, effort), daivi prakriti (Divine Nature, primal force), and sraddha (faith);
- vijnana (knowledge), which consists of jnanam (knowledge), trikaladrsti (knowledge of past, present and future), ashtasiddhi (eight powers), and samadhi (absorption);
- Sharira (body), which consists of arogyam (health), utthapana (levitation, being free from gravity and physical powers), saundaryam (beauty), vividhananda (bliss);
- Karma (divine work), which consists of Krishna (avatar of Vishnu), Kali (the Goddess), kama (divine delight), and Karma (divine action);
- Brahma, the realization of Brahman;
- Siddhi (realization), which consists of shuddhi (purification), mukti (liberation), bhukti (enjoyment), and siddhi (realisation of yogic powers).

== Influence ==
Aurobindo had a strong influence on Ken Wilber's integral theory of spiritual development. Wilber's Causal and Ultimate stages closely resemble Aurobindo's higher mental stages, but Wilber lumps together levels of Being, types of Being and developmental stages.

== See also ==
- Neo-Vedanta

== Sources ==
=== Printed sources ===
Sri Aurobindo

- Sri Aurobindo (1939), The Life Divine, Sri Aurobindo Ashram press, ISBN 978-81-7058-844-3
- Sri Aurobindo (1977), The Life Divine (10th ed.), Sri Aurobindo Ashram Trust
- Sri Aurobindo (1996), The Synthesis of Yoga, Lotus light publication, ISBN 0-941524-65-5
- Sri Aurobindo (1988), "Transformation of the Subconscient and the Inconscient", Letters on yoga. Volume 3, Part Four, Lotus press, ISBN 8170580099

The Mother

- The Mother (1961), Mother's Agenda 1951-1973. Volume II: 1961, Paris: Inst for Evolutionary Research, ISBN 2902776047
- The Mother (1998), Satprem (ed.), Mothers Agenda 1969, vol. 10, Institut de Recherches Evolutives, ISBN 8185137366
- The Mother (1980), Words of the Mother, Collected Works of the Mother, Centenary Edition vol.13, Sri Aurobindo Ashram Trust, Pondicherry

Other sources

- Chakravorty, Satya Jyoti (1991), The Philosophy of Sri Aurobindo, Sterling Publishers
- Giri, Ananta Kumar (2014), Knowledge and Human Liberation: Towards Planetary Realizations, Anthem Press
- McDermott, Robert A. (2001), "Introduction", The Essential Aurobindo, SteinerBooks
- Miśra, Rāmacandra (1998), The Integral Advaitism of Sri Aurobindo, Motilal Banarsidass Publications
- O'Connor, June (2005), "Aurobindo Ghose", in Jones, Lindsey (ed.), MacMillan Encyclopedia of Religions, MacMillan
- Pani, R.N. (2007), Integral Education:thought & Practical, APH Publishing, ISBN 9788131302866
- Sharma, Ram Nath (1991), Sri Aurobindo's Philosophy of Social Development, Atlantic Publishers
- Sobel, Jyoti; Sobel, Prem (1984), The Hierarchy of Minds, Pondicherry: Sri Aurobindo Ashram Trust
- Vrinte, Joseph (1996), The Quest for the Inner Man: Transpersonal Psychology and Integral Sadhana, Pondicherry, India: Sri Mira Trust, ISBN 81-208-1502-5
- Vrinte, Joseph (2002), The Perennial Quest for a Psychology with a Soul : An inquiry into the relevance of Sri Aurobindo's metaphysical yoga psychology in the context of Ken Wilber's integral psychology, Motilal Banarsidass, ISBN 81-208-1932-2
- Wilber, Ken (1992), Het Atman project, Servire
