= Evolution (Sri Aurobindo) =

Evolution, in the philosophy of Sri Aurobindo and Mirra Alfassa (The Mother), is the dynamic process by which the Divine Consciousness, previously "involved" or concealed within Matter, progressively emerges.

According to this view, "nothing can come out of nothing"; Life emerges from Matter and Mind from Life only because the Spirit is already involved within them. While Western knowledge has traditionally focused on matter and often rejected the Spirit, Integral Yoga seeks to restore the authority of the Spirit over a fully developed matter, creating an integral education and evolution. Just as Nature evolved beyond Matter to manifest Life, and beyond Life to manifest Mind, it must now evolve beyond Mind to manifest the Supermind or Truth-Consciousness. This evolution aims to transform human existence into a divine life upon earth.

== Involution and the Manifestation ==
Involution is the prerequisite for evolution. It is defined as the process by which the Divine Reality conceals itself by stages to create a material universe, ending in the apparent "Inconscience" of Matter.

The origin of the universe is described as the Supreme becoming aware of Himself, and the creation involves a separation from this Origin. Through this separation, Consciousness changed into Inconscience and Truth into Falsehood, creating the material world as we know it. The material universe is thus an objectification of the Supreme, a "progressive objectivisation" of that which is potentially contained in the Divine.

=== Satchitananda ===
The fundamental reality behind the manifestation is the triune principle of Satchitananda:

- Sat (Existence)
- Chit (Consciousness)
- Ananda (Bliss)

== The Levels of Being (Evolution) ==
Evolution is the "inverse action of the involution," the progressive emergence of the Spirit involved in Matter. The levels of this emergence correspond to the traditional koshas (sheaths):

=== Matter (Material) ===
This is the "nethermost stage" of existence. It is a form of veiled Life and Consciousness where the Spirit is "involved," "asleep," or "somnambulist," acting through a mechanical, apparently inconscient force.

=== Life (Vital) ===
This is the "intermediate power" between Mind and Matter. It liberates the consciousness absorbed in Matter into "sensitive action and reaction." In its lower forms, it is marked by submental sensation; in its higher forms, it manifests as desire, hunger, and the struggle for possession and satisfaction.

=== Mind (Mental) ===
The Mind is a "power of the Ignorance seeking for Knowledge." It is a consciousness that proceeds by "separation and distinction," viewing the whole through fragmented parts. It acts as a "final dividing action" of the Supermind, giving rigid forms to the fluid possibilities of Life.

== The Higher Levels of Mind ==
Above the ordinary conceptual Mind lie specific gradations of spiritual consciousness that ascend toward the Supermind.

The Gradations of Mind (Ascending towards Supermind)
| Plane | Characteristic Power | Function |
|---|---|---|
| Overmind | Cosmic Consciousness | The "Golden Lid" separating the lower hemispheres from the Truth; links the human mind to the Supermind. |
| Intuition | Direct Truth-Perception | Immediate knowledge without the need for thought; a "projecting blade" of the Supermind. |
| Illumined Mind | Spiritual Light / Vision | Works through revelation and vision rather than conceptual thought. |
| Higher Mind | Conceptual Knowledge | A luminous thought-mind of spirit-born knowledge. |

== Supermind ==
The Supermind, defined as the "Truth-Consciousness," is a principle of consciousness superior to mentality. Unlike the mind, which operates through division and appearances, the Supermind exists and acts in the fundamental truth and unity of things.

It possesses the knowledge of the One Reality and the consciousness of Unity. In the supramental manifestation, diversity is not abolished but harmonized; it is a "diversity in oneness" where contradictory elements become complementary parts of a whole. The Supermind is the power that can transform the world by replacing the ignorance and division of the mental consciousness with the Truth-Consciousness.
