= Record of Yoga =

Record of Yoga is the personal diary of the Indian philosopher and yogi Sri Aurobindo, recording his yogic practice during the period from 1909 to 1927. The manuscripts document his daily experiments with the Sapta Chatusthaya (Seven Quadrates), a system of seven groups of four elements which served as the programme for his yoga. It uses a specialized terminology including Sanskrit words, abbreviations, and symbols, making it a highly technical text.

In 1977, the editors of the project published a revised and corrected edition of Sri Aurobindo's Complete Works and started the journal Sri Aurobindo: Archives and Research in which over the next 18 years they published the newly discovered writings. Record of Yoga was published in book form in two volumes in 2001. Because of the extensive use of technical terms and abbreviations, a glossary is included to explain the specific meanings Sri Aurobindo adapted for his experience. The work provides the practical background for the "Yoga of Self-Perfection", the fourth part of his major work The Synthesis of Yoga.
