= Universal evolution =

Theory of evolution

Universal evolution is a theory of evolution formulated by Pierre Teilhard de Chardin and Julian Huxley that describes the gradual development of the Universe from subatomic particles to human society, considered by Teilhard as the last stage.

== Vernadsky's and Teilhard's theories ==
Vladimir Ivanovich Vernadsky influenced Pierre Teilhard de Chardin, and the two formulated very similar theories describing the gradual development of the universe from subatomic particles to human society and beyond. Teilhard's theories are better known in the West (and have also been commented on by Julian Huxley), and integrate Darwinian evolution and Christianity, whilst Vernadsky wrote more purely from a scientific perspective. One critical departure from actual scientific consensus within this theory and others like it is the misconception of evolution as a teleological process, in which progress or an end goal which is more advanced in some predefined way — rather than an organism or population being more or less fit for its environment or niche as in biological evolutionary theory — is characteristic of the mechanistic process described. It is unclear whether theorists of this kind are properly educated on the subject of evolution by natural selection (or its contemporary update in the modern synthesis with genetics), or if instead, such an enlightened understanding of high-school level science will only emerge among a more "evolved" era of spiritual masters which may emerge from the conjectured system(s) of progression under discussion.

Three classic levels are described. Cosmogenesis (Teilhard) or the formation of inanimate matter (the Physiosphere of Wilber), culminating in the Lithosphere, Atmosphere, Hydrosphere, etc. (Teilhard), or collectively, the Geosphere (Vernadsky). Here progress is ruled by structure and mechanical laws, and matter is primarily of the nature of non-consciousness (Teilhard - the "Without").

This is followed by Biogenesis (Teilhard) and the origin of life or the Biosphere (Vernadsky, Teilhard), where there is a greater degree of complexity and consciousness (Teilhard - the "Within"), ecology (Vernadsky) comes into play, and progress and development is the result of Darwinian mechanisms of evolution.

Finally there is human evolution and the rise of thought or cognition (Vernadsky, Teilhard), and a further leap in complexity and the interior life or consciousness (Teilhard), resulting in the birth of the Noosphere (Vernadsky, Teilhard). Just as the biosphere transformed the geosphere, so the noosphere (human intervention) transformed the biosphere (Vernadsky). Here the evolution of human society (socialization) is ruled by psychological, economic, informational and communicative processes.

For Teilhard there is a further stage, one of spiritual evolution, the Christing of the collective noosphere, in which humanity converges in a single divinisation he calls the Omega Point.

== Evolutionary stages ==
Nine levels are described, the "classical" biological stages being levels 6, 7 & 8 of the universal evolution. Stages 1 to 5 are grouped into the Lithosphere, also called Geosphere or Physiosphere, where (the progress of) the structure of the organisms is ruled by structure, mechanical laws and coincidence. Stages 6 to 8 are grouped into the Biosphere, where (the progress of) the structure of the organisms is ruled by genetical mechanisms. The actual stage, stage 9, is called the Noosphere, where (the progress of) the structure of human society (socialization) is ruled by psychological, informational and communicative processes.

== See also ==
- Gaia theory
- Involution (esoterism)
- Metaphysical cosmology
- Moore's law
- Noosphere
- Spiritual evolution
- Universal Darwinism
