= Involution (esotericism) =

Several notions of a counterpart to evolution

The term involution has various meanings. In some instances it refers to a process prior to evolution which gives rise to the cosmos, in others it is an aspect of evolution, and in still others it is a process that follows the completion of evolution in the human form.

== According to esoteric cosmology ==
In theosophy, anthroposophy and Rosicrucianism, involution and evolution are part of a complex sequence of cosmic cycles, called Round. When the universe attains a stage of sufficient density, the individual spirit is able to descend and participate in the evolution. Involution thus refers to the incarnation of spirit in an already established matter, the necessary prerequisite of evolution:

As an example, the so-called descent of the Monad into matter means an involution or involving or infolding of spiritual potencies into material vehicles which coincidentally and contemporaneously, through the compelling urge of the infolding energies, unfold their own latent capacities, unwrap them, roll them forth; and this is the evolution of matter.

— Gottfried de Purucker

That period of time devoted to the attainment of self-consciousness and the building of the vehicles through which the spirit in man manifests, is called involution. Its purpose is to slowly carry life lower and deeper into denser and denser matter for the building of forms, till the nadir of materiality is reached. From that point, life begins to ascend into higher Worlds. This succeeding period of existence, during which the individual human being develops self-consciousness into divine omniscience, is called "spiritual evolution".

In the cosmology of Surat Shabda Yoga, involution and evolution apply to both the macrocosm, the whole of creation, and the microcosm, the constitution of an individual soul.

The Rosicrucian Cosmo-Conception, a Rosicrucian text written by Max Heindel, advances the concept of epigenesis as the key related to the evolution (after an involutionary period) of human beings.

== According to Sri Aurobindo ==
=== Introduction ===
For Sri Aurobindo, involution is the process by which the Omnipresent Reality, i.e. the Absolute, Brahman extends Itself to create a universe of separate forms from out of Its own Force/Energy.

Sat, Chit-Tapas, and Delight/Ananda are the three aspects of Satchitananda, and they are part of involution. Spirit or consciousness manifests as these three, and then as the intermediate link of Supermind, which is transitional between the higher and lower (matter, life, and mind) nature.

The reason for involution is Delight—the Delight of Being (the Spirit or Absolute) moving to Delight of Becoming (temporal existence, the cosmos). Being throws itself forward into a multiplicity of forms, becoming lost in the inconscience of matter, and then through evolution it partakes in the Delight of rediscovering the Spirit which had been hidden in the interim.

Evolution is thus the movement forward by which the created universe evolves from its initial state of inconscience (i.e. as matter), evolves animated life forms and mental beings (i.e. humans), and continues to evolve spiritual properties, and in that process rediscovers its Source. Such an Evolution of animated forms is only possible because at each stage of development, the developing entity contains within itself the conception of what it may become. Thus, the evolution of animated life out of matter supposes a previous involution of that animated capacity. This is akin to a seed that already has the essence of the tree that will emerge from it.

Each plane emerges from an earlier plane through the evolutionary process, which takes place in chronological time. But in a parallel construction, each of these new planes can be understood as being a descendant of its corresponding higher order plane from the Infinite. Thus, when mentality emerged in the universe, the universal plane of Mind was implanted to a degree in those beings harboring that mentality.

The evolution is the development of all entities in the cosmos, including humans, in order to attain their fulfillment, including the discovery of spiritual Delight, which was, and always is, the experience of the Source Creator. The evolution is the progressive development from the original inconscience of matter into life (movement, sensation, desire, etc. and living physical beings), and from thence to mind (in conscious animals and most especially humans—the self-conscious thinking animal), and from thence to spiritualized mind, culminating in The Supermind or Truth Consciousness (as supramental individuals, and finally the supramental, i.e. a divine life on earth).

=== Sat ===
We cannot speak of Sat without Chit and Ananda—-or Being, Consciousness and Bliss, respectively. They represent a totality. Sat is the vital state of that which is, was and always will be. In a sense it is a beginnining but because it is pregnant with possibility it is inexorably tied to Ananda or the recognition of Being and then the subsequent realization of bliss which is divine inner knowing. Each flows out of the other and then back again. It could be said that Sat only exists through Ananda or Consciousness however, these levels of differentiation cannot grasp the true nature of either of these three qualities since they are interdependent.

"Sat—being, existence; substance; "pure existence, eternal, infinite, indefinable, not affected by the succession of Time, not involved in the extension of Space, beyond form, quantity, quality", the first term of saccidananda and the principle that is the basis of satyaloka; "the spiritual substance of being" which is cast "into all manner of forms and movements"; existence as "the stuff of its own becoming", which on every plane is "shaped into the substance with which Force has to deal" and "has formed itself here, fundamentally, as Matter; it has been objectivised, made sensible and concrete to its own self-experiencing conscious-force in the form of self-dividing material substance" short for sat brahman."

=== Chit-tapas ===
Chit-Tapas or Consciousness-Force, in Sri Aurobindo's philosophy refers to the pure energy of Consciousness by which creation ultimately comes about; the infinite divine self-awareness which is also the infinite all-effective Will. It is also one of the seven planes of existence, according to the Vedic cosmology and the seven lokas of Hindu thought.

In chapter 10 of The Life Divine, Sri Aurobindo writes at length on the nature of Consciousness-Force as a principle of the Divine. As he understands it (following the Tantric dichotomy of Shiva and Shakti), Chit or Consciousness is not an inert and passive principle; but contains the potential spiritual Energy, Tapas_(Indian_religions), which in Creation becomes the dynamic and creative principle or Force, called Shakti. Chit-Tapas or Chit-Shakti is therefore the universal Consciousness-Force, the divine Energy; the Mother.

=== Delight ===
Delight is Sri Aurobindo's term for ananda, and plays a large part in his cosmology and spiritual teaching. Delight is the reason for creation, by which The Absolute extends its Delight of Being into multiplicity, losing itself in the unconscious and then through Delight rediscovering Itself through individuals realising their Divine nature and proceeding to spiritual realisation.

In other words, the universe was created so that the Delight of the Infinite Spirit can manifest in all the forms of creation. When we discover our higher nature, the soul and spirit, we experience the delight for which we were came into being and of which we are a part.

In chapters 11 and 12 of The Life Divine, Sri Aurobindo writes at length on the nature of Delight as a principle of the Divine, and its role in creation.

== Meher Baba ==
Meher Baba uses the term "involution" to mean the inner path of a spiritual aspirant toward Self-realization. He divides involution into seven stages he calls "planes," and describes different experiences and powers had on each, until the Goal of full enlightenment is achieved at the seventh plane.

== Other Indian interpretations ==
=== Baba Hari Dass ===
For Baba Hari Dass (a Maunisadhu monk who practices continual silence), evolution and involution are key concepts on universal level that have also individualized expressions in mental processes. In Samkhya and Yoga Sutras of Patanjali, in yoga practice, those two states are conditions of mind (chitta), with the mind's outward-evolution expressions (pravritti) and the inward-involution expressions (nirvritti). Nirvritti is the involution stage where "Yoga is the control of thought waves in the mind" (Sutra 2, Samadhi Pada). Outward expressions of mental activity, vritti, draw the mind to the afflicting experiences, and in effect produce afflicting impressions of klishta-vritti, or vyutthana samskaras (outgoing mind). Involution, or deep introspection in yoga, leads to the opposite results and attenuates afflicting impressions to the finest degree possible with the end result of aklishta-vritti (non-painful thought waves). Thus, when the mind is liberated from painful impressions, one-pointed mind (ekagra samskara) is achieved, which can be said to be the goal of yoga. One-pointed mind is the foundation of samprajnata and asamprajnata samdhi, or "super-consciousness".

== Integral thought ==
In integral thought, involution is the process by which the Divine manifests the cosmos. The process by which the creation rises to higher states and states of consciousness is the evolution. Involution prepares the universe for the Big Bang; evolution continues from that point forward. The term involution comes from the idea that the divine involves itself in creation. After the creation, the Divine (i.e. the Absolute, Brahman, God) is both the One (the Creator) and the Many (that which was created).

The integral philosopher Ken Wilber refers to involution in his online chapter of Kosmic Karma, employing concepts from Plotinus, Advaita Vedanta, Tibetan Buddhism, and Sri Aurobindo. According to Wilber, the cosmic evolution described in his previous works is preceded by an involution of Spirit into Matter. This involution follows the reverse stages to the sequence of evolution—e.g. Spirit to soul to mind to life to matter. Once the stage of insentient, lifeless matter is attained, then "something like the Big Bang occurs", whereupon matter and manifest world come into concrete existence, from which stage evolution follows.

== Gurdjieff ==
Involution and evolution are important themes in the cosmology of G. I. Gurdjieff (1866? – 1949), addressed in detail in his book Beelzebub's Tales to His Grandson.

In a popular presentation of Gurdjieff's teaching by P. D. Ouspensky and others, different terminologies are often preferred: "ascending and descending octaves" (evolutionary and involutionary processes), "the Ray of Creation" (the full scale of involutionary processes), "emanation" (the initiation of involutionary processes at the prime source), etc.

Like Aurobindo and others, Gurdjieff uses the word involution in reference to a top-down flow in the universe contributing to the creation and maintenance of cosmoses. Gurdjieff's main emphasis, however, was the mystery of how the descending flow of involution could change into the ascending flow of evolution. Exactly in this mystery, Gurdjieff looked for the significance of all living creatures, particularly man.

== See also ==
- Esotericism
- Etiology
- Law of Complexity/Consciousness
