= The Problem of Aryan Origins =

1980 book by K.D. Sethna

- Author: K.D. Sethna
- Subject: Aryan Invasion Theory
- Genre: Non-fiction
- Publication date: 1980

The Problem of Aryan Origins is a book by K.D. Sethna. The first edition was published in 1980. A second enlarged version (with five supplements) was published in 1992. (Delhi: Aditya Prakashan, 1992.ISBN 81-85179-67-0)

The book questions the validity of the Aryan Invasion Theory.

The first supplement contains a criticism of the first edition of the book and Sethna's reply. The fifth supplement is a detailed survey in over 200 pages of Asko Parpola's study "The Coming of the Aryans to Iran and India and the Cultural and Ethnic Identity of the Dasas".

The book had a considerable influence on later writers on this subject. A particularity of the book is that Sethna often refers to Sri Aurobindo's interpretation of the Rig Veda.
