= Hermann Poppelbaum =

Hermann Poppelbaum Dr. Phil. (1891–1979) was an anthropologist, psychologist, philosopher, anthroposophist, teacher and author.

== Life ==
Poppelbaum was well known in both Germany and England as an expert on the works of the Austrian philosopher Rudolf Steiner (1861–1925). Poppelbaum was a Visiting Lecturer in anthropology and psychology at Alfred University near Rochester, NY.

In 1963, shortly before the death of Guenther Wachsmuth, the Executive Council at the Goetheanum announced the formation of the "Section for Nutrition and Agriculture" to be led by Gerhard Schmidt. The remainder of the Natural Science Section was then headed by Poppelbaum.

== Works ==
- Mensch und Tier by Hermann Poppelbaum (Philosophisch-Anthroposophischer Verlag Goetheanum, 1975)
- Entwicklung, Vererbung und Abstammung, wie Rudolf Steiner sie sehen lehrte by Hermann Poppelbaum (Philosophisch-Anthorposophischer Verlag am Goetheanum, 1974)
- A new zoology. by Hermann Poppelbaum (Philosophic-Anthroposophic Press, 1961)
- Mensch und Tier by Hermann Poppelbaum (Philosophisch-Anthroposophischer Verlag am Goetheanum, 1956)
- Man and animal by Hermann Poppelbaum (Anthroposophical publishing co., Anthroposophic press, 1931)
- Man's eternal biography by Hermann Poppelbaum(Adonis Press, 1945)
- The battle for a new consciousness by Hermann Poppelbaum (Mercury Press, 1993) Paperback
- Tier- Wesenskunde. by Hermann Poppelbaum (Verlag am Goetheanum, 1 January 1982) Paperback
- Enigmas del Destino. Encarnacion Reencarnacion by Hermann Poppelbaum (Antroposofica, January 2005) Paperback
- Man as Compendium of the Animal Kingdom by Hermann Poppelbaum (from the Autumn 1944 edition of The Forerunner)
- Can Supersensible Facts Be Proven? by Hermann Popelbaum (published in Journal for Anthroposophy, Spring, 1970, #11.)
- Die Seelischen Und Geistigen Untergrunde Des Sports. (Philo-Anthroposophischer Verlag, C. 1929)
- Menschengemässe Naturerkenntnis-Gesammelte Aufsätze. Rudolf Geering. 1942
- Schicksalsrätsel-Verkörperung Und Wiederverkörperung. Phil. -Anthr. 1959
- Im Kampf Um Ein Neues BewußTsein. Novalis-Verlag. 1948
- Tier-Wesenskunde. Verlag Emil Weises Buchh. 1937
- Tier-Wesenskunde. Zweite, Erweiterte Auflage. Phil. -Anthr. Verlag. 1954
- Bio-Dynamic Farming and Gardening (Bio-Dynamic Agricultural. 1950)
- Truth and Error in Astrology. (New Knowledge Books, England)
- New Light on Heredity and Evolution by H. Poppelbaum. Paperback Date Published: 1977 ISBN 978-0-916786-15-1 ISBN 0916786153

== See also ==
- Anthroposophy
