= Spiritual evolution =

Evolution of the mind or spirit

Spiritual evolution, also called higher evolution, is the idea that the mind or spirit, in analogy to biological evolution, collectively evolves from a simple form dominated by nature, to a higher form dominated by the spiritual or divine. It is differentiated from the "lower" or biological evolution.

== Definition ==
An alternate term is "Higher Evolution." According to Piyasīlo,

— The term 'Higher' here refers to the mind - the basis of spiritual evolution. In contrast to the Higher Evolution, the biological (or Darwinian) evolution is known as the Lower Evolution.

The concept of spiritual evolution is teleological, in contrast to biological evolution.

== Origins of the concept ==
=== Western esotericism ===
Theories of spiritual evolution are important in many Occult and Esoteric teachings, which emphasise the progression and development of the individual either after death (spiritualism) or through successive reincarnations (Theosophy, Hermeticism).

==== The great chain of being ====
The concept of the Great Chain of Being was developed by Plato and Aristotle whose ideas were taken up and synthesised by Plotinus. Plotinus in turn heavily influenced Augustine's theology, and from there Aquinas and the Scholastics. The Great Chain of Being was an important theme in Renaissance and Elizabethan thought, had an under-acknowledged influence on the shaping of the ideas of the Age of Enlightenment and played a large part in the worldview of 18th century Europe. And while essentially a static worldview, by the 18th and early 19th century it had been "temporalized" by the concept of the soul ascending or progressing spiritually through the successive rungs or stages, and thus growing or evolving closer to God. It also had at this time an impact on theories of biological evolution.

E. F. Schumacher, author of Small is Beautiful, has recently proposed a sort of simplified Great Chain of Being, based on the idea of four "kingdoms" (mineral, vegetable, animal, human). Schumacher rejects modernist and scientific themes, his approach recalling the universalist orientation of writers like Huston Smith, and likely contributing to Ken Wilber's "holonomic" hierarchy or "Great Nest of Being".

==== Spiritualism ====
Spiritualists reacted with uncertainty to the theories of evolution in the late 19th and early 20th century. Broadly speaking, the concept of evolution fit the spiritualist thought of the progressive development of humanity. At the same time, however, a belief in the animal origins of man threatened the foundation of the immortality of the spirit, for if man had not been created, it was scarcely plausible that he would be specially endowed with a spirit. This led to spiritualists embracing spiritual evolution.

In the 19th century, Anglo-American Spiritualist ideas emphasized the progression of the soul after death to higher states of existence, in contrast to Spiritism which admits to reincarnation.

Spiritualism taught that after death, spirits progressed to new spheres of existence. According to this idea, evolution occurred in the spirit world “at a rate more rapid and under conditions more favorable to growth” than encountered on earth.

The biologist and spiritualist Alfred Russel Wallace (1823–1913) believed that qualitative novelties could arise through the process of spiritual evolution, in particular, the phenomena of life and mind. Wallace attributed these novelties to a supernatural agency. Later in his life, Wallace was an advocate of spiritualism and believed in an immaterial origin for the higher mental faculties of humans. He believed that evolution suggested the universe had a purpose, and that certain aspects of living organisms are not explainable in terms of purely materialistic processes. In a 1909 magazine article entitled The World of Life, which he later expanded into a book of the same name Wallace argued in his 1911 book World of life for a spiritual approach to evolution and described evolution as “creative power, directive mind and ultimate purpose”. Wallace believed natural selection could not explain intelligence or morality in the human being so suggested that non-material spiritual forces accounted for these. Wallace believed the spiritual nature of man could not have come about by natural selection alone, the origins of the spiritual nature must originate “in the unseen universe of spirit”.

Robert Broom in his book The Coming of Man: Was it Accident or Design? (1933) claimed that "spiritual agencies" had guided evolution as animals and plants were too complex to have arisen by chance. According to Broom there were at least two different kinds of spiritual forces, and psychics are capable of seeing them. Broom claimed there was a plan and purpose in evolution and that the origin of Homo sapiens is the ultimate purpose behind evolution. According to Broom "Much of evolution looks as if it had been planned to result in man, and in other animals and plants to make the world a suitable place for him to dwell in.

The Anglo-American position recalls (and is presumably inspired by) 18th century concepts regarding the temporalization of The Great Chain of Being. Spiritual evolution, rather than being a physical (or physico-spiritual) process is based on the idea of realms or stages through which the soul or spirit passes in a non-temporal, qualitative way. This is still an important part of some spiritualist ideas today, and is similar to some mainline (as opposed to fundamentalist) Protestant Christian beliefs, according to which after death the person goes to "summerland" (see Spirit world)

==== Theosophical conceptions ====
Theosophy presents a more complex cosmology than Spiritualism, although emerging from the same general milieu. H. P. Blavatsky developed a highly original cosmology, according to which the human race (both collectively and through the succession of individual reincarnation and spiritual evolution) passes through a number of Root Races, beginning with the huge, ethereal, and mindless Polarian or First Root Race, through the Hyperborean (2nd), Lemurian (3rd), Atlantean (4th) and our present "Aryan" 5th Race. This, according to Blavatsky, will give rise to a future, Post-Aryan, 6th Root Race of highly spiritual and enlightened beings that will arise in Baja California in the 28th century. Blavatsky claimed this will later give rise to an even more sublime 7th Root Race, before to superhuman and cosmic states of existence.

Blavatsky's ideas were further developed by her successors, such as C.W. Leadbeater, Rudolf Steiner, Alice Bailey, Benjamin Creme, and Victor Skumin each of whom went into detail in constructing baroque cycles of rounds, races, and sub-races. Skumin elaborated on the theosophical conceptions of spiritual evolution and proposed (1990) a classification of Homo spiritalis (Latin: spiritual man), the sixth root race, consisting of eight subraces: HS0 Anabiosis spiritalis, HS1 Scientella spiritalis, HS2 Aurora spiritalis, HS3 Ascensus spiritalis, HS4 Vocatus spiritalis, HS5 Illuminatio spiritalis, НS6 Creatio spiritalis, and HS7 Servitus spiritalis. According to Skumin:

- Anabiosis spiritalis is spirituality in the potential of unmanifest accumulations of personality, the charge of the fires of spiritual creation;
- Scientella spiritalis is the cordial presentiment of the presence and demands of the spirit, spiritualization of the fire of centers, glimpses of self-consciousness of a spiritual person;
- Aurora spiritalis is the imperative of the spirit, the action of the spiritual fire of the centers in the heart, the kindling of the fire of the spirit, the formation of the orientation of the personality to the spiritual improvement of life;
- Ascensus spiritalis is the dawn of spiritual aspirations, the action of the fire of the spirit in the heart, searching spiritual work, aspiration of self-consciousness to merge with the One Spirit;
- Vocatus spiritalis is the maturation of spiritual accumulations, the purposeful spiritual creation, self-awareness and realization of a person as a warrior of the spirit;
- IIluminatio spiritalis is the beginning of the fiery transmutation, the lighting of the achievement fire; revealing the identity of man - the earthly carrier of the Thoughts of the One Spirit;
- Creatio Spiritalis is the beginning of fiery creation, the action of the fire of achievement in the heart, the revealing self-consciousness of man as the earthly carrier of the Light of the One Spirit;
- Servitus Spiritalis is the carrying a consciously accepted duty-commission, the synthesis of spirituality in the clarity of knowledge of a fiery man.

Although including elements of the science of her day as well as both eastern and western esoteric thought, Blavatsky rejected the Darwinian idea that man evolved from apes, and most subsequent esotericists followed this lead. Darwinism, with its explanation of evolution through material factors like natural selection and random mutation, does not sit well with many spiritual evolutionists, for whom evolution is initiated or guided by metaphysical principles or is tending towards a final spiritual or divine state. It is believed by Theosophists that humans are evolving spiritually through a series of esoteric initiations and in the future humans will become esoteric masters themselves as their souls gradually rise upward through the spiritual hierarchy over the course of eons as they reincarnate.

Despite this, recent Theosophists and Anthroposophists have tried to incorporate the facts of geology and paleontology into their cosmology and spiritual evolution (in Anthroposophy Hermann Poppelbaum is a particularly creative thinker in this regard). Some have attempted to equate Lemuria with Gondwanaland, for example. Today all these ideas have little influence outside their specialised followings, but for a time Theosophical concepts were immensely influential. Theosophy-like teachings also continue today in a group of religions based on Theosophy called the Ascended Master Teachings.

==== Rosicrucians ====
Rosicrucians view the world as a training school, which posits that while mistakes are made in life, humans often learn more from mistakes than successes. Suffering is considered as merely the result of error, and the impact of suffering on the consciousness causes humans to be active along other lines which are found to be good, in harmony with nature. Humans are seen as spirits attending the school of life for the purpose of unfolding latent spiritual power, developing themselves from impotence to omnipotence (related also to development from innocence into virtue), reaching the stage of creative gods at the end of mankind's present evolution: Great Day of Manifestation.

In esoteric spirituality epigenesis it is the idea that since the mind was given to the human being, it is the original creative impulse which has been the cause of all of mankind's development. According to this approach, humans build upon that which has already been created, but add new elements because of the activity of the spirit. Humans have the capacity, therefore, to become creative intelligences—creators. For a human to fulfill this promise, his training should allow for the exercise of originality, which distinguishes creation from imitation. When epigenesis becomes inactive, in the individual or even in a race, evolution ceases and degeneration commences.

=== Neo-Vedanta ===
According to Gosling, Swami Vivekananda based most of his cosmological and biological ideas on Samkhya. Influenced by western thought and esotericism, Vivekananda and Sri Aurobindo developed a view on reincarnation in which an involution of the Divine into matter takes place, and the person has to evolve over multiple lives until the Divine gains recognition of its true nature and liberation is attained.

Samkhya is one of the six systems of Hindu philosophy; proto-Samkhya ideas can be found in the Upanishads, Jainism, and Buddhism. Samkhya posits two ontological entities, Purusha (witness-consciousness) and prakriti ('nature'), which includes mind, cognition, and the perceived objects). According to Samkhya, when purusha comes into proximity with prakriti it disturbs the equilibrium of prakriti. As a result, a number of successive essences called tattvas evolve from prakriti. The most subtle tattwas emerge first, then progressively grosser ones, each in a particular order, and finally the elements and the organs of sense. Adherents of samkhya-Yoga adhere to the release of purusha from prakriti, and the return of prakriti to the unmanifest condition.

Sri Aurobindo and Pierre Teilhard de Chardin both describe a progression from inanimate matter to a future state of Divine consciousness. Teilhard de Chardin refers to this as the Omega Point, and Sri Aurobindo as the Supermind.

Teilhard, who was a Jesuit Paleontologist who played an important role in the discovery of Peking Man, presented a teleological view of planetary and cosmic evolution, according to which the formation of atoms, molecules and inanimate matter is followed by the development of the biosphere and organic evolution, then the appearance of man and the noosphere as the total envelope of human thought. According to Teilhard evolution does not cease here but continues on to its culmination and unification in the Omega Point, which he identifies with Christ.

=== New Age ===
New Age thought is strongly syncretic. A common theme is the evolution or the transcendence of the human or collective planetary consciousness in a higher state or higher "vibratory" (a metaphor taken from G. I. Gurdjieff) level.

David Spangler's communications speak of a "New Heaven and a new Earth", while Christopher Hills refers (perhaps influenced by Sri Aurobindo) to the divinization of man.

Jonathan Livingston Seagull narrated the idea of evolution in a fascinating fashion. James Redfield in his novel The Celestine Prophecy suggested that through experiencing a series of personal spiritual insights, humanity is becoming aware of the connection between our evolution and the Divine. More recently in his book God and the Evolving Universe: The Next Step in Personal Evolution (2002) co-written with Michael Murphy, he claims that humanity is on the verge of undergoing a change in consciousness.

It is also known as the path of Ascension.

== Stage theory ==
The idea of a spiritual evolution finds contemporary expression in a number of stage theories, inspired by Sri Aurobindo, Jean Gebser, and Piaget, among others. In these models, human development, both individual and collectively, is conceptualized as going through a number of structural stages, from the primitive psychophysical genesis to the full-grown rational, cognitive and moral abilities, and beyond to transpersonal stages in which unconscious drives are fully recognized and integrated, and the sense of a separate identity is loosened or abandoned.

=== Spiral dynamics ===
An interpretation of social and psychological development that could also be considered a theory of spiritual evolution is spiral dynamics, based on the work of Clare W. Graves. Spiral Dynamics posits a series of stages through which human's cultural development progresses – from a survival-based hunter-gatherer stage to a magical-tribal-agrarian stage to a city-building-invading stage to a mythic-religious-empire stage to a rational-scientific-capitalist stage to a green-holistic-inclusive stage and then ascending to a second tier where all the previous stages are contemplated and integrated and a third transpersonal tier where a spiritual unity or Omega point is eventually reached, which all the other stages are struggling to embody. He feels that individuals in each of the meme-plexes/stages can ascend to the peak of consciousness – these being the prophets, visionaries and leaders of any region/age.

=== Ken Wilber ===
More recently the concept of spiritual evolution has been given a sort of respectability it has not had since the early 19th century through the work of the integral theorist Ken Wilber, in whose writings both the cosmological and the personal dimensions are described. In this integral philosophy (inspired in part by the works of Plotinus, Hegel, Sri Aurobindo, Eric Jantsch, and many others) reality is said to consist of several realms or stages, including more than one of the following: the physical, the vital, the psychic, (after the Greek psyche, "soul"), the causal (referring to "that which causes, or gives rise to, the manifest world"), and the ultimate (or non-dual), through which the individual progressively evolves. Although this schema is derived in large part from Tibetan Buddhism, Wilber argues (and uses many tables of diagrams to show) that these same levels of being are common to all wisdom teachings. Described simplistically, Wilber sees humans developing through several stages, including magic, mythic, pluralistic, and holistic mentalities. But he also sees cultures as developing through these stages. And, much like Hegel, he sees this development of individuals and cultures as the evolution of existence itself. Wilber has also teamed up with Don Beck to integrate Spiral Dynamics into his own Integral philosophy, and vice versa.

== See also ==
Concepts

- Metaphysical cosmology
- Esoteric cosmology
- Evolution (philosophy)
- Hindu idealism
- Ietsism
- Involution (metaphysics)
- Plane (cosmology)
- Religious cosmology
- The Celestine Prophecy

Persons

- Schelling (1775-1854)
- Hegel (1770-1831)
- Carl Jung (1875-1961)
- Max Théon (1848-1927)
- Helena Petrovna Blavatsky (1831-1891)
- Henri Bergson (1859-1941)
- Rudolf Steiner (1861-1925)
- Sri Aurobindo (1872-1950)
- Nikolai Berdyaev (1874-1948)
- Jean Gebser (1905-1973)
- Pierre Teilhard de Chardin (1881-1955)
- Owen Barfield (1898-1997)
- Arthur M. Young (1905-1995)
- Edward Haskell (1906-1986)
- E. F. Schumacher (1911-1977)
- Erich Jantsch (1929-1980)
- Clare W. Graves (1914-1986)
- Alfred North Whitehead (1861-1947)
- Terence McKenna (1946-2000)
- P. R. Sarkar (1921-1990).
- William Irwin Thompson (born 1938)
- Victor Skumin (born 1948)
- Ken Wilber (born 1949)
- Brian Swimme (born 1950)
- Alexander Zelitchenko (born 1956)

== Sources ==
- Gosling, David (June 2011). "Darwin and the Hindu Tradition: Does What Goes Around Come Around?". Zygon. 46 (2): 345–347–348–353. doi:10.1111/j.1467-9744.2010.01177.x.
- Mackenzie Brown, C., ed. (2020), Asian Religious Responses to Darwinism: Evolutionary Theories in Middle Eastern, South Asian, and East Asian Cultural Contexts, Springer Nature
- Piyasīlo, Piya Tan (1991). The Buddha's teachings: a study of comparative Buddhism in truth, tradition & transformation. Dharmafarer integrated syllabus series (2 ed.). Dharmafarer Enterprises. p. 130. ISBN 9789839030013.

== Video ==
- "Periods of Humanity (Part 4/4 - Krauncha & Beyond)". youtube.com. 19 July 2020. Archived from the original on 8 July 2022.
