= Ānanda (Hindu philosophy) =

Eternal bliss which accompanies the ending of the rebirth cycle

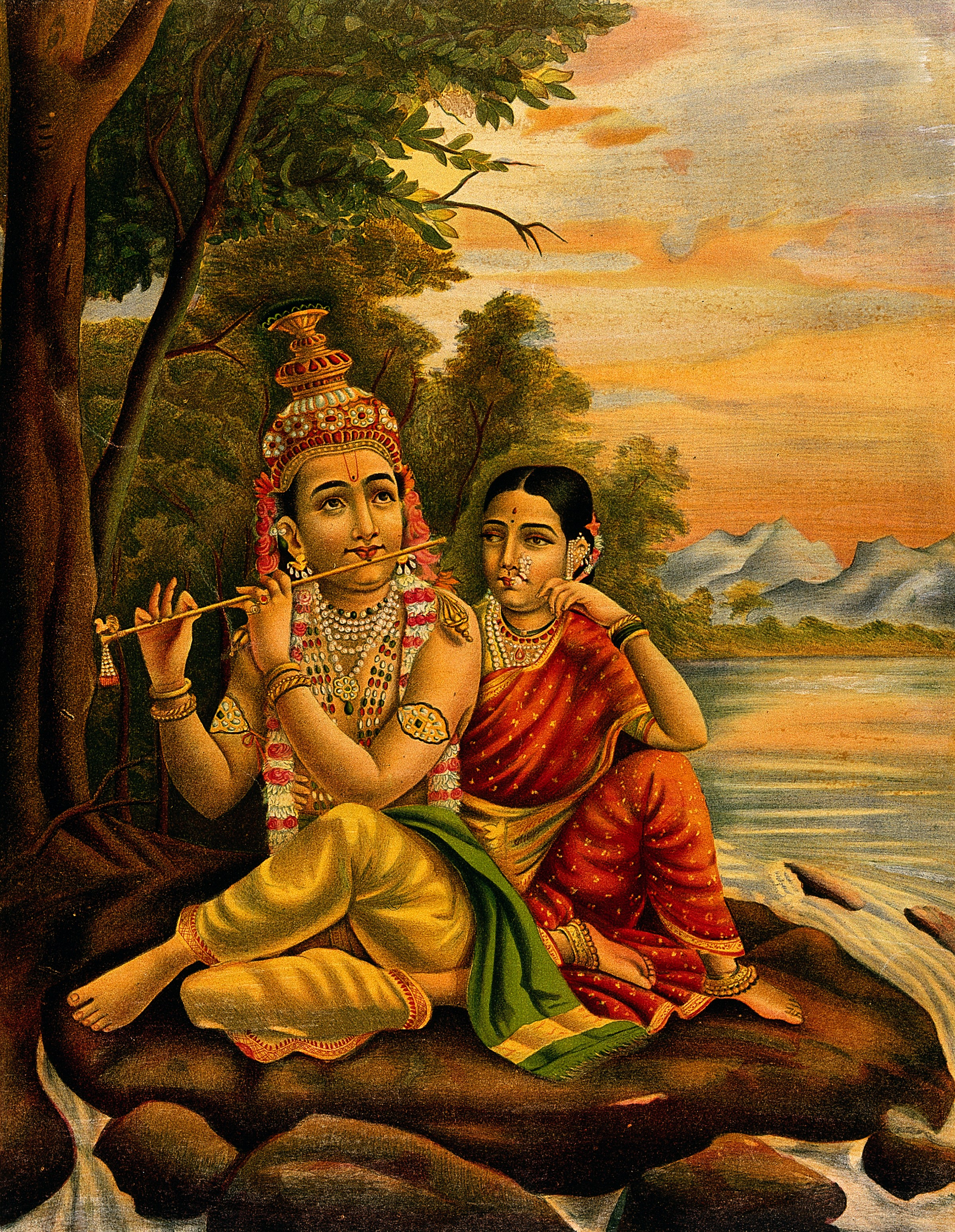
The deity Krishna is often associated with ananda.

Ānanda (Sanskrit: आनन्द) literally means bliss or happiness. In the Hindu Vedas, Upanishads and Bhagavad Gita, ānanda signifies eternal bliss which accompanies the ending of the rebirth cycle. Those who renounce the fruits of their actions and submit themselves completely to the divine will, arrive at the final termination of the cyclical life process (saṃsāra) to enjoy eternal bliss (ānanda) in perfect union with the godhead. The tradition of seeking union with God through loving commitment is referred to as bhakti, or devotion.

== Etymology ==
Ānanda is a Sanskrit word regarded as a verbal noun nanda prefixed with ā. ā indicates the place where the verbal action occurs; for example, āsrama, where one toils, ārama, where one enjoys oneself, ākara, where things are scattered, etc. The word ānanda thus implies a locus, that in which one finds bliss, be it a son, the fulfillment of a wish, the knowledge of brahman, or the atman. Ānanda is not just a free-floating unfocused bliss, it has an implied object.

== Ananda in Vedas and Upanishads ==
=== Shatapatha Brahmana ===
In the Shatapatha Brahmana (10.3.5.13), ānanda is defined as the knowledge of Brahman, which transforms a person into a divine being. Verse 10.3.5.14 emphasizes that ānanda, when understood as knowledge, is connected with the fulfillment of wishes, echoing a verse from the Rigveda (9.113.11), where attaining all desires (ānanda) is a prerequisite for immortality.

=== Taittiriya Upanishad ===
Perhaps the most comprehensive treatise on 'ānanda' is to be found in the Ananda Valli of Taittiriya Upanishad, where a gradient of pleasures, happiness, and joys is delineated and distinguished from the "ultimate bliss" (ब्रह्मानंद)- absorption in Self-knowledge, a state of non-duality between object and subject. This essential description of 'ānanda' as an aspect of the non-dual Brahman is further affirmed by Adi Shankara's commentary on the Brahma Sutras, Chapter 1, Section 1, Shloka 12, आनन्दमयोऽभ्यासात्.

Taittiriya Upanishad verses 2.3.3-9 describes the self (atman) as self-luminous and covered by five sheaths, with bliss (ānanda) as the innermost and subtlest layer.

== Ananda in Vedanta schools ==
=== Advaita Vedanta ===
According to the Vedanta school of Hindu philosophy, ananda is that state of sublime delight when the jiva becomes free from all sins, all doubts, all desires, all actions, all pains, all sufferings and also from all physical and mental ordinary pleasures. Having become established in Brahman it becomes jivanmukta (a being free from the cycle of rebirth).

In his commentary on anandamaya adhikarana (Brahma Sutras 1.1.12-19), Shankara gives reasons for identifying anandamaya with Brahman. The suffix -maya need not mean "made of"; it can also mean "abounding in". Brahman is also identified as the source of bliss in Taittiriya Upanishad 2.7 and no further inner self is mentioned after the self of bliss. Shankara then argues that annamaya (food), pranamaya (breath) , manomaya (mind), and vijnanamaya (understanding) use -maya to denote modification, and same meaning should apply to anandamaya (bliss). He also notes the bliss-self has parts, including joy as its head and satisfaction a its right arm, which do not fit the partless Brahman.

=== Dvaita vedanta ===
Based on a reading of the Bhagavad Gita, Dvaita vedanta interprets ananda as happiness derived via good thoughts and good deeds that depend on the state and on the control of the mind. Through evenness of temper and mind, the state of supreme bliss is reached in all aspects of one's life.

=== Ananda in Kashmir Shaivism ===
Abhinavagupta views ānanda as integral to spiritual realization. He speaks of liberation through the union of Shiva (the non-dual absolute) and Shakti (the totality of existence). Abhinavagupta also identifies bliss as one of the five fundamental aspects of the supreme (Shiva).

=== Ramanuja ===
According to Ramanujacharya of the Vishishtadvaita vedanta school, true happiness arises through divine grace, which becomes available through the surrender of one's ego to the Divine. The practice of prapatti (unreserved submission to the Lord) allows the soul's bondage to the delusions of independence to be transcended in the supreme bliss of devotion to the Divine.

== Ananda in modern Vedanta ==
According to Swami Vivekananda, the one great idea common to all religions is that every soul is connected to the divine, that divinity is our true nature:

We are one with Infinite Existence, we are one with Infinite Knowledge, and we are one with Infinite Bliss. The Sat-Chit-Ananda, the Existence-Knowledge-Bliss Absolute, is the nature of the Soul; and all things and beings that we see in the world are Its expressions, dimly or brightly manifested.

Sri Aurobindo, in his book The Life Divine, discusses ānanda as the "delight of existence", an infinite delight of being that is the essential nature of consciousness, and the reason and basis of all things:

Delight is existence, Delight is the secret of creation, Delight is the root of birth, Delight is the cause of remaining in existence, Delight is the end of birth and that into which creation ceases. "From Ananda" says the Upanishad "all existences are born, by Ananda they remain in being and increase, to Ananda they depart."

Ramana Maharshi proposes that ananda can be attained by inner enquiry, by following the thought "Who am I?" to its deepest level. 'I' is the unqualified substratum underlying all qualified states. Sat-Chit-Ananda (being-consciousness-bliss) is the Self, the residuum left over after discarding all that is not-self.

Nacheva notes that the term sat-chit-ananda "is notably absent from texts that can be confidently attributed to Sankara, as well as from works predating him" and describes it as a concept belonging to later Advaita Vedanta and other later traditions.

== Ways of achieving ānanda ==
Within the various schools of Hindu thought, there are different paths and ways of achieving Happiness. The main four paths are Bhakti yoga, Jnana yoga, Karma yoga and Raja yoga.

== See also ==
- Satcitananda
- Sukha

== Sources ==
- Long, Jeffery D.; Sherma, Rita D.; Jain, Pankaj; Khanna, Madhu, eds. (2022). Hinduism and Tribal Religions. Encyclopedia of Indian Religions. Dordrecht: Springer Netherlands. doi:10.1007/978-94-024-1188-1. ISBN 978-94-024-1187-4.
