= K. D. Sethna =

Indian historian and writer (1904–2011)

K.D. Sethna
- Born: Kaikhosru Dhunjibhoy Sethna; 26 November 1904; Bombay, Maharashtra, India
- Died: 29 June 2011 (aged 106); Sri Aurobindo Ashram, Pondicherry, India
- Occupations: Poet, scholar, writer, philosopher, and cultural critic
- Writing career
- Pen name: Amal Kiran

Kaikhosru Dhunjibhoy Sethna (26 November 1904 – 29 June 2011) was an Indian poet, scholar, writer, philosopher, and cultural critic. He published more than 50 books. He was known by the diminutive Kekoo, but wrote his poetry under nom de plume of Amal Kiran.

== Childhood ==
Sethna was born as a Parsi in Bombay on 25 November 1904. His father was a physician and specialist eye surgeon. He was a voracious reader and also a bit of a writer, giving his son a lot of support in developing his talents.

At the age of two and a half, Sethna suffered a polio infection, crippling his left foot. He recalled having the temperament of Reza Shah Pahlavi, as an infant and would have been a soldier if not for his infection. Three years later, when several therapeutic efforts had failed, his father took him to London for a corrective operation after which Sethna was able to walk straight again, though with a slight limp.

== Youth and education ==
Sethna received his early education at the reputed St. Xavier's College, a Roman Catholic institution run by Jesuit priests. He practically grew up with English as his mother tongue and was less fluent in Parsi Gujarati, also spoken at home.

He began his literary career very early, publishing book reviews in newspapers and magazines. His first book, titled Parnassians, appeared in 1924. It was a collection of essays on the works of H. G. Wells, George Bernard Shaw, G. K. Chesterton and Thomas Hardy. When one of Sethna's well-wishers sent a copy of the book to Wells, the latter is reported to have commented, “the young man will go far.”

== His spiritual journey ==
As a college student, Sethna started reading books on Hatha Yoga and Raja Yoga and especially the works of Swami Vivekananda. He also met a saint in Bombay and a yogi in Maharashtra and felt inspired through these meetings.

Some time later Sethna learned of Sri Aurobindo from a Theosophist and also discovered an article on the Sri Aurobindo Ashram which he read with great interest. After having married his long-term girlfriend Daulat, a fellow Parsi, they decided to go to Pondicherry for visiting Sri Aurobindo and the Mother (Mirra Alfassa).

== Joining the Sri Aurobindo Ashram ==
Sethna and his wife arrived in the Ashram in December 1927. After having met the Mother and Sri Aurobindo, he decided to join the Ashram along with his wife, who was renamed "Lalita", which is a name of one of Radha's companions. Sethna received from Sri Aurobindo the new name "Amal Kiran", meaning "Pure Ray".

As a first work, Sethna was given the task of managing the Ashram stores, looking after the various practical needs of the members. Much of his free time he dedicated to developing his poetry, regularly sending his numerous creations to Sri Aurobindo for getting his opinion and corrections. In 1936 Sri Aurobindo started sending him his handwritten texts of his literary main work Savitri: A Legend and a Symbol for typing. As a result, there also followed a correspondence on Sri Aurobindo's spiritual poetry, discussing its peculiar characteristics, its style and planes of inspiration.

Some time in 1937, Sethna and his wife were divorced, and he married Sehra, a Parsi friend of his youth from Bombay. She remained his companion until her death in 1980. The death of Sehra and the death of his nephew the noted advocate Dhun Canteen Wall is said to have nearly caused him to lose his equipoise.

== Mother India ==
In 1949, the journal Mother India was started by the Ashram. Its purpose was to discuss current topics, both National and International, from a viewpoint which was in line with Sri Aurobindo's thought, although it was not directly meant to be his mouthpiece. Sethna was appointed its editor, and he sent all his political articles for approval to Sri Aurobindo. However, after Sri Aurobindo's departure in 1950 the Mother advised Sethna not to touch directly on politics.

The articles were not only on Sri Aurobindo and his yoga, but also included many other topics in the field of literature, culture and art. The authors were, apart from the editor himself, other members of the Ashram or followers of Sri Aurobindo and sometimes also outsiders.

== Literary works ==
Apart from his contributions in Mother India, Sethna also occasionally published articles in other journals and wrote more than fifty books on Sri Aurobindo, the Mother, integral Yoga, poetry, science, philosophy, ancient Indian history and other subjects. His great sense of humour came out in his title Light and Laughter.

Sethna was born a Parsi-Zoroastrian, but discontinued its practice after becoming a disciple of Sri Aurobindo. He celebrated his 100th birthday in 2004. At the time of his death, at the age of 106, on June 29, 2011, he was one of the world's oldest living authors. For the last few years of his life, he had stayed at the Ashram Nursing Home.

His sister Minnie Canteenwalla, was also a poet of some repute within the Aurobindo community. She was married to Nariman Canteenwalla (sometimes spelled Canteenwala).

== Literature ==
- P. Raja (2018), K.D. Sethna. New Delhi, Sahitya Akademi. ISBN 9788126052837

== Partial bibliography ==
- Amal Kiran, Light and Laughter
- ---- Talks on Poetry
- ---- India and the World Scene, ISBN 81-7060-118-5
- ---- The Indian Spirit and the World's Future, ISBN 81-7060-227-0
- Sethna, K.D., Altar and Flame
- ---- The Mother, Past-Present-Future, 1977
- ---- Obscure and the Mysterious
- ---- The Problem of Aryan Origins, 1980, 1992; ISBN 81-85179-67-0
- ---- Overhead Poetry
- ---- The Passing of Sri Aurobindo, 1951.
- ---- Sri Aurobindo on Shakespeare
- ---- Sri Aurobindo- The Poet
- ---- The Obscure and the Mysterious: A Research in Mallarmé's Symbolist Poetry
- ---- Teilhard de Chardin and Sri Aurobindo - a focus on fundamentals, Bharatiya Vidya Prakasan, Varanasi (1973)
- ---- The Spirituality of the Future. A search apropos of R. C. Zaehner's study in Sri Aurobindo and Teilhard de Chardin (1981), Fairleigh Dickinson University Press, Associated University Presses.
- ---- The Vision and Work of Sri Aurobindo
- ---- Problems of Ancient India, 2000, New Delhi: Aditya Prakashan. ISBN 81-7742-026-7
- ---- Ancient India in a New Light ISBN 978-8185179124
