= Chit (consciousness) =

Sanskrit word meaning consciousness

Chit (Sanskrit: चित् or Cit) is a Sanskrit word meaning consciousness. It is a core principle in all ancient spiritual traditions originating from the Indian subcontinent, including Hinduism, Sikhism and Jainism.

== Hinduism ==
In Upanishads it is referred to as the Drshta or the Seer, and the sense that makes all other sense experiences possible. Chit is one of three aspects forming the satcitananda nature of the Absolute, according to the Vedic scriptures.

== See also ==
- Satcitananda
- Citta
- Siddhar
