= Supermind (integral yoga) =

Concept in Sri Aurobindo's philosophy of integral yoga

In Sri Aurobindo's philosophy, Supermind (or "Truth-Consciousness") is the dynamic manifestation of the Absolute, often described as the "Real-Idea" or the movement of Knowledge-Will that creates the universe. It functions as the "intermediate link" between the indivisible unity of Spirit (Sachchidananda) above and the divided consciousness of Mind and the manifest world below. Furthermore, it is considered the unique power capable of effecting the "integral transformation" of human nature into Divine nature, thereby establishing a divine life on earth.

== Nature and Function ==
In Sri Aurobindo's philosophy, Supermind (also referred to as Mahas or the Truth-Consciousness) constitutes the fourth aspect of the "upper hemisphere" of existence, following Sat (Pure Existence), Chit (Consciousness-Force), and Ananda (Bliss). Its primary function is to facilitate manifestation by differentiating the "One" into the "Many" while maintaining a consciousness of their underlying Unity; unlike the human Mind, which functions through division and separation, the Supermind operates through integral knowledge based on identity with the object of knowledge. Sri Aurobindo emphasized that opening to this plane involves a long, difficult process of transformation, explicitly rejecting the expectation of an "instantaneous miracle" or the satisfaction of personal desires for sudden good fortune.

Sri Aurobindo's Cosmological Structure
The Upper Hemisphere (Parārdha) (Realm of Unity, Knowledge, and Spirit)
1. Sat	Pure Existence
2. Chit	Consciousness-Force
3. Ananda	Bliss / Delight
The Intermediate Link
4. SUPERMIND	Mahas / Truth-Consciousness (The Creator Power; Real-Idea)
The Veil (Overmind)
The Lower Hemisphere (Aparārdha) (Realm of Ignorance, Division, and Time)
5. Mind	Knowledge by Division
6. Life	Vital Force
7. Matter	Physical Form

== Supramentalisation and the Gnostic being ==
According to Sri Aurobindo, full yogic development consists of two parts: the standard yogic goal of ascent into a formless and timeless self, and the descent and establishment of the supramental consciousness into Earthly life. Through integral yoga, one actualises the Supermind, for the supramental consciousness transforms the entire being and leads to the divinisation of the material world.

This supramental transformation gives rise to a new individual, the Gnostic being, which is fully formed by the supramental power. Division and ignorance are overcome, and replaced with a unity of consciousness. The physical body will be transformed and divinised. The gnostic being sees the spirit everywhere in the world, and in every other person. This awareness eliminates the usual separation between man and life, and between people. One sees that all existences are various forms of the divine reality. Every individual existence in life plays a role in the unfolding of existence. The Gnostic beings can work together to create a new common life; this new life is superior to the present way of being. A nucleus or sufficient number of such individuals can create the foundation of a new social life and order. This will lead to a greater unity, mutuality, and harmony.

== The Supramental Descent ==
On 29 February 1956, Mirra Alfassa (The Mother) announced that the manifestation of the Supramental upon earth was no longer a promise but a living fact. This event served as the culmination of the work described by Sri Aurobindo, who stated that the "supramental change is a thing decreed and inevitable" and that the Mother’s specific role in their joint yoga was "to bring down the supramental". Sri Aurobindo had previously clarified that this descent was not meant to be an arbitrary miracle, but a rapid evolutionary process pouring the Truth-Consciousness into the inferior planes to transform the earth-nature.

Subsequently, on 1 January 1969, The Mother (at age 90) experienced the "arrival" of a new consciousness, which she identified on 8 January 1969 as the "superman consciousness" – "the intermediary between man and the supramental being". This correlates with Sri Aurobindo's earlier vision that the whole earth-consciousness would not be supramentalised immediately; rather, there would first appear "a new race representing the supermind, as man represents the mind". This transitional stage is necessary because the gulf between the human mind and the Supermind is too great to be crossed in a single bound; therefore, intermediate powers must descend to bridge the gap and prepare the physical nature for the supreme Light.

== See also ==
- Evolution (metaphysics)
- Posthumanism and Posthuman
- Übermensch

== Sources ==
- Sri Aurobindo (1977) The Life Divine, (Sri Aurobindo Ashram Trust), ISBN 0-941524-62-0 (hardcover), ISBN 0-941524-61-2 (paperback)
- Beatrice Bruteau (1974), Evolution towards Divinity (Theosophical Publishing House, Wheaton, Ill)
- David M. Brookman, Teilhard and Aurobindo: A Study in Religious Complementarity, Mayur Publications, 1988
- J. Chetany (1978), The Future of Man According to Teilhard de Chardin and Aurobindo Ghose, New Delhi, Oriental Publishers & Distributors
- Jan Feys, (1973) The Philosophy of Evolution in Sri Aurobindo and Teilhard de Chardin, Calcutta: Firma K. L. Mukhopadhyay
- Basant Kumar Lal, Contemporary Indian Philosophy Motilal Banarsidass, 1978 ISBN 81-208-0261-6 ; pp. 195 ff.
- George Nedumpalakunnel, Realization of God According to Sri Aurobindo: A Study of a Neo-Hindu Vision on the Divinization of Man Claretian Publications, 1979
- K. D. Sethna (1973), Teilhard de Chardin and Sri Aurobindo - a Focus of Fundamentals, pp. 34–5, (Bharatiya Vidya Prakasan, Varanasi)
- K. D. Sethna (1981). The spirituality of the future : a search apropos of R. C. Zaehner's study in Sri Aurobindo and Teilhard de Chardin. Rutherford, [N.J.] London,
- Ramakant A. Sinari, The Structure of Indian Thought C. C. Thomas 1970 p. 244
- Zaehner, R.C. (1971) Evolution in religion: a study in Sri Aurobindo and Pierre Teilhard de Chardin, Clarendon Press, Oxford.
