= Saccidānanda =

Hindu concept of the Ultimate Reality

Saccidānanda (Sanskrit: सच्चिदानन्द; also Sat-cit-ānanda) is an epithet and description for the subjective experience of the ultimate unchanging reality, called Brahman, (Note: Brahman is "the unchanging reality amidst and beyond the world", which "cannot be exactly defined", but is being-consciousness-bliss and the highest reality.) in certain branches of Hindu philosophy, especially Vedanta. It represents "existence, consciousness, and bliss" or "truth, consciousness, bliss".

== Etymology ==
Saccidānanda (सच्चिदानन्द; pre-sandhi form sat-cit-ānanda) is a compounded Sanskrit word consisting of "sat", "cit", and "ānanda", all three considered as inseparable from the nature of ultimate reality called Brahman in Hinduism. The different forms of spelling is driven by euphonic (sandhi) rules of Sanskrit, useful in different contexts.

- sat (सत्): In Sanskrit, sat means "being, existence", "real, actual", "true, good, right", or "that which really is, existence, essence, true being, really existent, good, true". (Note: Another translation is offered by Sugirtharajah, who suggests a "palpable force of virtue and truth".)
- cit (चित्): means "consciousness" or "spirit".
- ānanda (आनन्द): means "happiness, joy, bliss", "pure happiness, one of three attributes of Atman or Brahman in the Vedanta philosophy". Loctefeld and other scholars translate ananda as "bliss".

Satcitananda is therefore translated as "truth consciousness bliss", "reality consciousness bliss", or "Existence Consciousness Bliss".

== Discussion ==
The term is contextually related to "the ultimate reality" in various schools of Hindu traditions. In theistic traditions, satcitananda is the same as God such as Vishnu, Shiva or Goddess in Shakti traditions. In monist traditions, satcitananda is considered directly inseparable from nirguna (attributeless) Brahman or the "universal ground of all beings", wherein the Brahman is identical with Atman, the true individual self. A Jiva is instructed to identify themselves with the Atman, which is the Brahman in a being, thus the purpose of human birth is to realize "I am Brahman" (Aham Brahmasmi) through Prajna which leads to the state of "ultimate consciousness" referred as sat-chit-ananda and subsequently Moksha, however as long as a being identifies with Maya which is finite, material and tangible, they will continue to gather Karma and remain in Saṃsāra. Satcitananda or Brahman is held to be the source of all reality, source of all conscious thought, and source of all perfection-bliss. It is the ultimate, the complete, the destination of spiritual pursuit in Hinduism.

=== Textual references ===
The Brihadaranyaka Upanishad (c. 800–600 BCE) is among the earliest Hindu texts which links and then discusses Atman (Self), Brahman (ultimate reality), awareness, joy and bliss such as in sections 2.4, 3.9 and 4.3. The Chandogya Upanishad (c. 800-600 BCE), in section 3.14 to 3.18, discusses Atman and Brahman, these being identical to "that which shines and glows both inside and outside", "dear", "pure knowing, awareness", "one's innermost being", "highest light", "luminous". Other 1st-millennium BCE texts, such as the Taittiriya Upanishad in section 2.1, as well as minor Upanishads, discuss Atman and Brahman in saccidananda-related terminology.

An early mention of the compound word satcitananda is in verse 3.11 of Tejobindu Upanishad, composed before the 4th-century CE. The context of satcitananda is explained in the Upanishad as follows:

The realization of Atman.

(...) I am of the nature of consciousness.
I am made of consciousness and bliss.
I am nondual, pure in form, absolute knowledge, absolute love.
I am changeless, devoid of desire or anger, I am detached.
I am One Essence, unlimitedness, utter consciousness.
I am boundless Bliss, existence and transcendent Bliss.
I am the Atman, that revels in itself.
I am the Sacchidananda that is eternal, enlightened and pure.

— Tejobindu Upanishad, 3.1-3.12 (Abridged)

=== Vedanta philosophy ===
The Vedantic philosophy understands saccidānanda as a synonym of the three fundamental attributes of Brahman. In Advaita Vedanta, states Werner, it is the sublimely blissful experience of the boundless, pure consciousness and represents the unity of spiritual essence of ultimate reality.

Satcitananda is an epithet for Brahman, considered indescribable, unitary, ultimate, unchanging reality in Hinduism.

=== Vaishnava philosophy ===
Tulsidas identifies Rama as Satcitananda.

== See also ==
- Ajativada
- Journey in Satchidananda
- Luminous mind
- Mahāvākyas
- Prajnaparamita
- Sahaja
- Swami Satchidananda
- Siddha
- Turiya
- Advaita Vedanta

== Bibliography ==
- MacFie, J.M. (2004), The Ramayan of Tulsidas or the Bible of Northern India, Kessinger Publishing
- Potter, Karl H. (2008), The Encyclopedia of Indian Philosophies: Advaita Vedānta Up to Śaṃkara and His Pupils, Delhi: Motilal Banarsidass Publishers Private Limited
- Puligandla, Ramakrishna (1997), Fundamentals of Indian Philosophy, New Delhi: D.K. Printworld (P) Ltd.
- Raju, P. T. (2013), The Philosophical Traditions of India, Routledge, p. 228, ISBN 9781135029425
- Jones, Constance; Ryan, James D. (2006), Encyclopedia of Hinduism, Infobase Publishing, p. 388, ISBN 9780816075645
- Sugirtharajah, Sharada (2004), Imagining Hinduism: A Postcolonial Perspective, Routledge, p. 115, ISBN 9781134517206
- Werner, Karel (2004), A Popular Dictionary of Hinduism, Routledge, ISBN 9781135797539
